= The Complete Short Prose 1929–1989 =

First edition

The Complete Short Prose 1929–1989 is a collection which includes all of Samuel Beckett's works written in prose, with the exception of his novels, novellas from Nohow On, and More Pricks Than Kicks which is considered "as much a novel as a collection of stories". The book was edited by S. E. Gontarski and published by Grove Press in 1995.

== Contents ==
- Introduction by S. E. Gontarski
- Assumption (1929)
- Sedendo et Quiescendo (1932)
- Text (1932)
- A Case in a Thousand (1934)
- First Love (1946)
- Stories and Texts for Nothing:
  - The Expelled (1946)
  - The Calmative (1946)
  - The End (1946)
  - Texts for Nothing (1950-1952)
- From an Abandoned Work (1954-1955)
- The Image (1956)
- All Strange Away (1963-1964)
- Imagination Dead Imagine (1965)
- Enough (1965)
- Ping (1966)
- Lessness (1969)
- The Lost Ones (1966,1970)
- Fizzles (1973-1975)
  - Fizzle 1 [He is barehead]
  - Fizzle 2 [Horn came always]
  - Fizzle 3 Afar a Bird
  - Fizzle 4 [I gave up before birth]
  - Fizzle 5 [Closed place]
  - Fizzle 6 [Old earth]
  - Fizzle 7 Still
  - Fizzle 8 For to end yet again
- Heard in the Dark 1
- Heard in the Dark 2
- One Evening
- As the story was told (1973)
- The Cliff (1975)
- neither (1976)
- Stirrings Still (1988)
- Appendix I: Variations on a "Still" Point
  - Sounds (1973)
  - Still 3 (1973)
- Appendix II: Faux Départs (1965)
- Appendix III: Nonfiction
  - The Capital of the Ruins (1946)
- Notes on the Texts
- Bibliography of Short Prose in English
- Illustrated Editions of Short Prose
