= Ping =

Ping may refer to:

== Arts and entertainment ==
=== Fictional characters ===
- Ping, a domesticated Chinese duck in the illustrated book The Story about Ping, first published in 1933
- Ping, a minor character in Seinfeld, an NBC sitcom
- Pingg, a character from Pingu
- Ping, the alias of Hua Mulan in the animated film Mulan
- Ping the Elastic Man, a comic character introduced in The Beano in 1938
- Professor Ping, a character in the film Barbarella
- Ping, a character in Carole Wilkinson's novel Dragonkeeper
- Po (Kung Fu Panda), the protagonist of the Kung Fu Panda franchise
  - Mr. Ping, Po's adopted father

=== Other uses in arts and entertainment ===
- "Ping" (short story), by Samuel Beckett
- Ping!, a 2000 film featuring Shirley Jones
- Ping, an ability in the trading card game Magic: The Gathering

== People ==
- Ping (given name)
- Ping (surname) (平), a Chinese surname
- Bing (Chinese surname) (邴), romanized Ping in Wade–Giles
- Ping (nickname)

== Places ==
- Ping River, Thailand
- Ping Island, Yongzhou, Hunan, China

== Science and technology ==
=== Computing ===
- Ping (blogging), used for blogs, RSS, and related web services
- Ping (networking utility), a computer network monitoring tool
- Ping (video games), the network latency between computers used in online gaming
- Mention (blogging), a reference to a user profile, especially called a "ping" when this delivers a notification sound
- Ping.fm, a defunct microblog social network
- iTunes Ping, a social network for music that was once built into Apple iTunes
- Ping Identity, an American software company

=== Other uses in science and technology ===
- Ping (unit), the Chinese equivalent of pyeong (坪), a Korean unit of area
- Ping, a pulse of sound in active sonar
- Ping project, a project of the European Molecular Biology network (EMBnet)
- Pinging, a noise indicative of improper combustion in internal combustion engines
- Epsilon Leporis, a star also named Ping

== Other uses ==
- Ping (golf), a manufacturer and brand name of golf equipment
- Bing (bread), also written as "ping", a type of Chinese flat bread
- "The Ping", a phenomenon present in the Fury and Hecla Strait, Canada

== See also ==
- Pinge (surname)
- PNG (disambiguation)
