= The Lost Ones (Beckett short story) =

English translation of Le Dépeupleur

- Author: Samuel Beckett
- Original title: Le Dépeupleur
- Translator: Samuel Beckett
- Language: French
- Publisher: Les Éditions de Minuit
- Publication date: 1970
- English publication date: 1971
- Media type: 12mo softcover
- Pages: 58
- ISBN: 9782707302885

The Lost Ones (French: Le Dépeupleur, lit. 'The Depopulator') is a novella by Samuel Beckett, who abandoned it in 1966 and completed it in 1970. It was then first published in French and translated into English by the author himself the following year.

== Background ==
Samuel Beckett derived the title Le Dépeupleur from a line in Alphonse de Lamartine's 1820 poem "L'Isolement": "Un seul être vous manque, et tout est dépeuplé" (You miss a single being, and everything is depopulated). He drafted the story between October 1965 and May 1966 before abandoning it because he could not figure out the ending. Later that year, the unwieldy draft was transmuted into "Bing" ("Ping") which adapted two passages from "The Lost Ones".

Beckett wrote, "Bing may be regarded as the result or miniaturization of Le Dépeupleur..." The story comes from a period where Beckett was implementing the architectural theories of Mies van der Rohe and Adolf Loos who said that "ornament is a crime". The writer was concerned with stripping "Anglo-Irish exuberance" from his work. After How It Is, Beckett's prose largely fixated on the interior landscape of the mind. As Beckett noted in the typescript for Watt, "the unconscious mind! What a subject for a short story!".

== Synopsis ==
The Lost Ones is set in an "abode where lost bodies roam each searching for its lost one". The abode is a flattened cylinder with rubber walls fifty meters in circumference and eighteen meters high. It is constantly illuminated by a dim, yellow light, and the temperature fluctuates between 5°C to 25°C, sometimes in as small an interval as four seconds. This leads to extremely parched skin, and the bodies brush against each other like dry leaves. Kisses make an "indescribable sound" and the rubber makes the footsteps mostly silent. There are 200 inhabitants, or one per square meter. Some are related to each other. Some are even married to each other, but the conditions make recognition difficult.

Spaced throughout the upper half of the cylinder are niches of varying size. Some are self-contained. Others are connected to each other by tunnels. The lost ones can climb into a niche by ladders which are distributed throughout the cylinder. The ladders are often missing rungs at irregular intervals. Most of the lost ones have an irrepressible desire to climb the ladders, and there are large queues around the base of each one, as the lost ones wait their turn to climb.

The cylinder has three separate, informal bands of activity. Around the periphery are the climbers waiting for their turns on the ladders. The periphery is also where the sedentary and vanquished lost ones prefer to lean against the wall, uninterested in searching or climbing anymore. As they are underfoot of the climbers, they are viewed as an annoyance. Just in from the outer band is a single-file line of lost ones who are weary of searching in the center of the sphere, where most of the lost ones reside.

Sex is an unlikely and rare occurrence due to the difficulties of achieving and maintaining an erection in the climate. When an erection does occur, it penetrates the "nearest tube". The likelihood of man and wife uniting in such a way is extremely low. Furthermore, because of the lack of floor space, no one ever lies down in the cylinder.

== Publication ==
Both "Le Dépeupleur" and "The Lost Ones" were published in a variety of formats, from mass market previews to art editions:

- "Dans le cylindre", Livres de France: Revue Littéraire Mensuelle XVIII^{e} année No. 1 (January 1967). An excerpt from the "Le Dépeupleur" draft.
- L'Issue. Editions Georges Visat, 1968. The third and fourth paragraphs of the finished story with engravings by Avigdor Arikha.
- Séjour. Georges Rechar, 1970. The story's first paragraph with engravings by Louis Maccard.
- "La Notion", L'Éphémère (Spring 1970). Preview of "Le Dépeupleur".
- The North. Enitharmon Press, 1972. The penultimate paragraph of "The Lost Ones" with Arikha engravings.
- The Lost Ones. Calder and Boyars, 1972. Beckett's English translation of "Le Dépeupleur".
- The New York Times published an excerpt from "The Lost Ones" on December 16, 1972.
- In the Spring 1973 issue, Evergreen Review published Beckett's entire novella with 12 illustrations by Philippe Weisbecker.

Dell issued this version as a paperback in 1973.

- The Lost Ones. New Overbrook Press, 1984. Intaglio prints by Charles S. Klabunde.

== Reception ==
The New York Times wrote, "For some years, Beckett's books have been getting shorter and shorter". They praised "Le Dépeupleur" as a masterpiece of indignation about metaphysical injustice. Reviewing the translation a year later, the Times saw Beckett as the dépeupleur of his own works, thinning out the language to create a style that presented "one of the signal modern ventures in concentrated attention".

Christopher Ricks praised Beckett's "deep narrow genius" and his unremitting vigilance. While comparing passages in translation, Ricks notes how Beckett flattens the Romanticism of French into sparse English. Even when Beckett alludes to Shakespeare, Milton, or Keats in his translations, their invocation is sardonic, such as when "un petit nombre du privilégiés" becomes "a happy few". The unmistakable reference to Henry V's St Crispin's Day Speech is cruelly applied to the happy few who have snapped off rungs of the ladder in order to "brain themselves".

== Adaptations ==
Beckett gave permission to Mabou Mines to stage The Lost Ones on the condition that it was only a "straight reading". During rehearsals, the reading expanded into a fully realized and filmed production directed by Lee Breuer. David Warrilow performed the text in a dark foam rubber cylindrical space with tiny HO scale plastic figures and ladders. The music was composed by Philip Glass. Beckett joked, "Sounds like a crooked straight reading to me." While Warrilow was preparing the production, he peppered Beckett with questions about the dimensions of the cylinder. Beckett confessed the original height dimension of eighteen meters was an error, "After all, you can't play fast and loose with pi."

In 2008, Sarah Kenderdine and Jeffrey Shaw created an art installation based on The Lost Ones, which they called Unmakeablelove. They used motion capture technology to animate the characters in the short story. The audience are able to see the characters only through the use of virtual torches, which interact with the animations creating a mixed reality. Unmakeablelove has been exhibited at Le Volcan in Le Havre, the Shanghai Museum of Science and Technology, and the Hong Kong International Art Fair.
