= From an Abandoned Work =

- Short story by Samuel Beckett
- Country: Ireland
- Language: English
- Genre: Avant-garde prose

Publication
- Published in: Trinity News
- Publisher: Faber and Faber (1958 book release)
- Media type: Print

From An Abandoned Work, a "meditation for radio" by Samuel Beckett, was first broadcast on BBC Radio 3’s Third Programme on Saturday, 14 December 1957 together with a selection from the novel Molloy. Donald McWhinnie, who already had a great success with All That Fall, directed the Irish actor Patrick Magee.

The work began as "a short prose piece, written about 1954-55, a step towards a novel soon abandoned" and Beckett's "first text written in English since Watt." Though initially published as a theater piece by the British publisher Faber and Faber following its performance on the BBC, it is now "generally anthologized with Beckett's short fiction".

Translated into French by Beckett with Ludovic and Agnès Janvier, it was published as "D'un ouvrage abandonné" by Les Éditions de Minuit in 1967 and included in Têtes-mortes, a collection of short stories.

== Synopsis ==
The first person narrative revolves around three days in the early life of a neurotic old man. "None of the days is described clearly or coherently and few details are given for the second and third days." It is unlikely that the days are actually chronologically contiguous although the general framework does tend to be, digressions aside.

The story begins with the old man remembering back to when he was young, probably a young man rather than a child per se (based on the assumption that the man is modelled on Beckett himself who only came to appreciate Milton in his early twenties whilst at Trinity College). He begins arbitrarily; at least he maintains, "any other [day] would have done". Despite feeling unwell he rises early and leaves the house but not so early that his mother isn't able to catch his eye from her window. He appears unclear in his own head if she is even waving at him – he's already at a fair distance when he notices her – and puts forth the notion, calculated to reduce any significance that could be attributed to her actions, that she may simply have been exercising, her latest fad, and not really trying to communicate anything at all.

The young man is prone to sudden rages. As he is walking away he feels "really awful, very violent [and starts to] look out for a snail, slug or worm" to squash. Despite his propensity towards violence – or perhaps to find excuse for it – he makes a point of never avoiding things that might exacerbate it whether these be small birds or animals or simply difficult terrain.

He becomes aware of a white horse at such a distance that despite the excellent sight he boasts of he cannot tell if a man, woman or child is following it. White is a colour that has a strong effect on him and he flies into a rage simply at the thought of it (See Classical conditioning). In the past he had tried "beating his head against something" but has discovered that short bursts of energy, "running five or ten yards", works best. After this he walks on for a bit and then heads home.

On the second day, despite having had another bad night, he leaves the house in the morning and doesn't return until nightfall. He describes being "set on and pursued by … stoats" which – perhaps significantly – he refers to as "a family or tribe" rather than using the more common collective noun, pack. This is noteworthy because he specifically mentions he has a good head for facts having "picked up a lot of hard knowledge". He survives the attack but regrets that he did not let them finish him off.

The events of the third day are distilled into the look he gets from an old road worker named Balfe of whom he had been terrified of as a child.

Once he has finished with these recollections we learn a little about where he is now. It appears he is still going for his daily perambulations, "out, on, round, back, in" as he puts it. And he is still in poor health. His throat, which has bothered him for as long as he can remember, still troubles him and he has developed earache. He regards himself now as a "mild" person and yet for some reason the violence of old erupts and he begins lashing about with his stick and cursing. His final thoughts are of vanishing from view in the tall ferns.

The man's constant sore throat may well be a psychosomatic condition; he frequently fidgets and cites one instance where he collapses in some kind of fit. He is clearly a disturbed individual with a great deal of pent up hostility particularly toward his parents. He refers to himself as "mad" but then acknowledges that he is probably merely "a little strange". His behaviour is obsessive, he has a propensity towards self-harm ("beating [his] head against [things])" and he garners some comfort from suicidal thoughts ("walking furious headlong into fire") but mainly from the inevitability that one day he will die anyway and all this will be over ("Oh I know I too shall cease to be as when I was not yet"). This evokes one of the central themes of all Beckett's work: Life may not be death but it is dying ("Astride of a grave and a difficult birth. Down in the hole, lingeringly, the grave digger puts on the forceps." – Waiting for Godot).

His relationship with his parents is not good; he says he would rather go to hell than join them in paradise in fact. He is glad that his father died early in his life so that he wouldn't have to be disappointed with the directionlessness of his son's life ("I have never in my life been on my way anywhere"). The mother's own somewhat eccentric behaviour meant that the two of them never became close; neither had spoken to the other in years following a dispute over money (perhaps his inheritance). The man talks of love but a love of the local flora (he is not far travelled) and imaginary fauna (creatures he has dreamt of), certainly not people. He wonders if he killed his parents and suspects that in a way, probably due to years of having to cope with his aberrant behaviour, he at least brought them a little closer to death. He has never married and so the family line – assuming he has no brother – will end with him, effectively killing off the family name.

== Interpretation ==
Scholars generally accept Beckett's own explanation of the title for this work, that it is merely the surviving portion of a novel. As Deirdre Bair puts it: "Unfortunately, he quickly reached a point beyond which he could go no further. He gave the fragment the self-explanatory title of From An Abandoned Work and went on to other things."

The title may recall a line from Hamlet (the prototypical madman): "What a piece of work is man". But, if Beckett is alluding to this speech then it would be ironically, even contemptuously; the narrator has given up on himself implied by the final phrase, "my body doing its best without me." J. D. O’Hara has suggested that the title is actually a pun, the neurotic protagonist having stopped his therapy, "for which the story functions as a kind of anamnesis" – a "talking cure". In this context he is the abandoned work.

White is a colour, which brings about a conditioned response. It is mentioned a number of times in the story in relation to a horse (five times), his mother (three times) but there are also references to white sheets and walls reminiscent of a hospital environment. Perhaps, when he uses the expression "if they don’t catch me", he is alluding to the fact he has run away from some institution.

"It is not difficult to see the Freudian themes running through this piece. "It dispenses with Freudian jargon but acknowledges crucial matters. A major unifying theme is the emphasis on traumatic childhood and the ghosts of memory haunting the maladjusted adult." Didier Anzieu commented that "[t]he originality of Beckett's narrative writing derives from the attempt (unacknowledged and probably unconscious) to transpose into writing the route, rhythm, style, form and movement of a psychoanalytic process in the course of its long series of successive sessions, with all the recoils, repetitions, resistances, denials, breaks and digressions that are the conditions of any progression."

A number of authors have looked at From An Abandoned Work from a Freudian perspective:

Michel Bernard, notes that the protagonist displays all the signs of oedipal trauma: "The questions that assail him reveal a murderous wish directed toward his father; at the same time, they disclose his fear of being punished by his father and, thus, his secret love for his mother".

Phil Baker claims that the text's "associative monologue about psychic distress still shows an unmistakable relationship to the talking cure". The narrator's preoccupation with the colour white fuels Baker's intertextual reading: "The association of the mother with whiteness, and the fascination with white dream animals and stillness versus movement, strongly recalls Freud’s famous case history, the Wolf Man".

J. D. O’Hara suggests that the text points to not only the Wolf Man, but also the Rat Man and Little Hans. The family of stoats that attacks the narrator is a point of particular interest functioning as a symbol of the narrator's turbulent relationship with his parents. According to O’Hara, the "brown form of a species that is sometimes white suggests that these stoats are … a negative image of his white and good parents". Treating his choices of collective noun as a Freudian slip would support this point of view.

Space precludes an in depth analysis of the whole text however the following list raises pertinent issues:

- Psychoanalysis says that to understand people's behaviour (their minds, mental processes), we must realise that it is geared not to objective reality, but to psychic reality; to simplify: the meanings attached to reality, the experienced reality.
- Dreams often come up in psychoanalysis, and provide a powerful route to what is emotionally important to a person, away from what the person is used to thinking of as important.
- What comes out spontaneously is always something that is important to the person ... Often intermediate steps are trivial. But what they lead to is important. The material in psychoanalysis (in the mind, in the unconscious) is organised associatively.
- Psychoanalysis sees people as interpreting the present in terms of the past. The experienced relationships with parents, siblings and other crucial others will supply patterns according to which later significant relationships are experienced.
- Opposing motives don't cancel each other out. If you intensely love as well as intensely hate your father, the result is never neutrality, or a weak love, or weak hatred. Love and hate coexist side by side. Your behaviour will express both feelings – perhaps partly at different times, perhaps simultaneously.
- When it comes to the crunch the emotional reality of adults is very much like that of children. Psychoanalysis sees the child in the man (See Developmental psychology).

From An Abandoned Work is a work of fiction that cites no psychoanalytical works in particular but gleaned inspiration from a multitude of sources. Beckett biographer James Knowlson observes, for example, that "R. S. Woodworth’s Contemporary Schools of Psychology provided him with the general framework that he needed."

Comparing the narrator to Molloy, critic Michael Robinson argues that one "can only assume […] that his future will take him to Malone's room and then to the Unnamable’s eloquent statis […] Despite the hero’s usual assurance that he "regret[s] nothing", the note of regret is continually raised throughout the monologue. [...] Its affinity with Krapp’s Last Tape is too great to be dismissed as coincidence. In the play there is the same nostalgia for a lost past" despite efforts to suppress their memories (Krapp's "Keep ‘em under!"). Both protagonists dwell on their dead mothers and the fact that each has let romantic love slip from his grasp.

Beckett considered Schubert's song cycle Winterreise as the composer's "masterwork". (See What Where). It tells of "the aimless winter journey of a disappointed lover, he is not ‘on [his] way anywhere, but simply on [his] way’. There is no narrative, actual or implied; just a series of encounters and departures – with and from places, landscapes, natural phenomena, animals and, marginally, human beings." The same description could equally apply to the narrator of From An Abandoned Work.

== History ==
"Proper names are less important in such works as The End, The Expelled, The Calmative, First Love [and] Texts for Nothing ... Here Beckett's method is to introduce an unnamed first person narrator; to give most of the secondary characters names related to their roles ("my father", "a policeman", a "cabman"); and to reserve proper names for only a few peripheral characters" such as, in From An Abandoned Work, Balfe.

The grotesque Balfe was a real person, a road worker in Foxrock, from Beckett's childhood. In an interview with James Knowlson in 1989 the eighty-three-year-old Beckett could still describe him with great clarity: "I remember the roadman, a man called Balfe, a little ragged, wizened, crippled man. He used to look at me. He terrified me. I can still remember how he frightened me." Balfe also makes a brief appearance at the end of Afar a Bird, in For To End Yet Again.

Because much of Beckett's writing focuses on mothers it is easy to forget the affection he held for his own father, Bill. From An Abandoned Work recalls an incident from 1933 where "Beckett and his father took a long walk in the Wicklow Hills. While Bill, swearing and sweating, stopped to rest under pretence of admiring the view" his son took the opportunity to try to explain Milton's Cosmology to him. "Though not a scholarly man, Bill Beckett may have recognised his son’s intellectual worth … [and] was willing to listen to a growing boy’s opinions and problems, [which] earned his son’s lasting affection." This emphasises the fact that although Beckett used his own life experiences as source material, as do most authors, it is not biography in the strictest sense.

Beckett has drawn heavily from his own life in the writing of this text. His difficult relationship with his mother is a major theme in his writing. "During breaks in Foxrock in January and April 1935, he himself linked the return of his night sweats and his ‘periods of speechless bad temper’ with his presence back in the family home." Throughout this, Beckett had a "tendency to suffer from ailments which were psychosomatic in origin".

== Productions ==
On first hearing a repeat of the BBC radio broadcast "Beckett [found he] was very impressed and moved by the cracked quality of Magee’s voice, [‘strangely déclassé] but still indubitably Irish’ which seemed to capture a sense of deep world-weariness, sadness, ruination and regret ... A few weeks later he began to compose a dramatic monologue", especially for him. Called initially simply "Magee Monologue" it was originally conceived as "another radio play" and was again firmly rooted in events from his own life; what resulted was Krapp’s Last Tape.

In 1978, the play was produced at the Stratford Festival with actor Douglas Rain (the voice of HAL 9000 in 2001: A Space Odyssey) in the lead role.

In 1980 the American actor-director Joe Chaikin expressed an interest in adapting the piece for the stage and sought advice from Beckett during a visit to Paris. Beckett was supportive and was happy to talk the matter over with him. This was not the first time this had been discussed though. In the mid-1960s Beckett suggested the following set-up to Shivaun O’Casey who wanted to present the work in a similar fashion to Play:

"Moonlight, ashcan a little left of centre. Enter man left, limping, with stick, shadowing in paint general lighting along. Advances to can, raises lid, pushes about inside with crook of stick, inspects and rejects (puts back in can) an unidentifiable refuse, fishes out finally tattered ms. Or copy of FAAW, reads along standing up ‘Up bright and early that day, I was young then, feeling awful, and out–’ and a little further in silence, lowers text, stands motionless, finally closes ashcan, sits down on it, hooks stick round neck, and reads text through from beginning, i.e. including what has been read standing. Finishes, sits a moment motionless, gets up, replaces text in ashcan and limps off right. Breathes with maximum authenticity, only effect to be sought in slight hesitation now and then in places where most effective, due to strangeness of text and imperfect light and state of ms."

== Art ==
=== Max Ernst ===
"A German translation appeared in a trilingual text (Stuttgart, Manus Presse, 1967), with original lithographs [printed at the Visat Studio, Paris, 1965] by Max Ernst." The total issued edition from the plates was of 135 impressions in three sets of 45 with differing colours.

=== Diarmuid Delargy ===
"In 1987 Samuel Beckett gave artist Diarmuid Delargy approval to create a number of etchings based on From An Abandoned Work. Delargy finally undertook the project in 1995 and completed it in 2000. The result was [a series of] 24 large etchings that are" now in the permanent collection at the Irish Museum of Modern Art. The series is entitled The Beckett Suite.
