= Ruth Maleczech =

American actress (1939–2013)

- Born: Ruth Sophia Reinprecht; January 8, 1939; Cleveland, Ohio, U.S.
- Died: September 30, 2013 (aged 74); Brooklyn, New York, U.S
- Occupation: Actress
- Spouse: Lee Breuer (m. 1978)
- Children: 2

Ruth Sophia Reinprecht (January 8, 1939 – September 30, 2013), professionally known as Ruth Maleczech, was an American avant-garde stage actress. She won three Obie Awards for Best Actress in her career, for Hajj (1983), Through the Leaves, (1984) and Lear (1990) and an Obie Award for Design, shared with Julie Archer, for Vanishing Pictures (1980), which she also directed. Her portrayal of King Lear as an imperious Southern matriarch in Lear was widely acclaimed.

== Life and career ==
Ruth Sophia Reinprecht was born in Cleveland, Ohio to Elizabeth (née Maletić, later Maletich; 1914–1996) and Frank Reinprecht (1912–1982), who had emigrated from Yugoslavia. Her parents were a steel worker and seamstress, respectively. She had two siblings, Frank and Patricia, with whom she was raised in Phoenix, Arizona.

Maleczech was the first in her family to attend college, beginning theater studies at UCLA at 16 where she met Mabou Mines co-founder Lee Breuer. From there they went to San Francisco and worked with Jules Irving and Herb Blau at the Actor's Workshop. In San Francisco, they also met Ronnie Davis and formed the R.G. Davis Mime Troupe which evolved into the San Francisco Mime Troupe. In 1964, Maleczech and Breuer traveled to Europe, spending time in Greece and Turkey and settling in Paris where they remained for six years earning money dubbing films, sufficient to fund their burgeoning theatrical experiments.

In France, Maleczech and JoAnne Akalaitis studied with the Polish director and drama theorist Jerzy Grotowski; Maleczech also spent a month in East Berlin studying, observing rehearsals and attending performances by Bertolt Brecht's storied Berliner Ensemble. Returning to the United States, Maleczech co-founded the experimental New York City theater company Mabou Mines, in 1970, along with Akalaitis, Breuer, Philip Glass and David Warrilow. Maleczech collaborated on nearly every piece Mabou Mines produced. She adopted a phonetic spelling of her mother's maiden name as her professional name (Maletich → Maleczech).

She directed/adapted several works: Wrong Guys, from the hard-boiled novel by Jim Strahs; Vanishing Pictures, based on Poe's Mystery of Marie Roget; Samuel Beckett's Imagination Dead Imagine (as a hologram); The Bribe by Terry O'Reilly; her own Sueños, inspired by the life of Sor Juana Inez de la Cruz; Belén: A Book of Hours, written by Catherine Sasanov; and Song For New York.

In addition to working together for a half century, she and Breuer had two children. They legally married in New York in 1978.

Outside of Mabou Mines, Maleczech created Fire Works with Valeria Vasilevski and collaborated and worked with, among others, Peter Sellars, Frederick Wiseman and Martha Clarke. She appeared in numerous feature films, commercial and independent, and on television in Law & Order and ER.

== Death ==
Ruth Maleczech died at age 74 from breast cancer and chronic obstructive pulmonary disease at her son's home in Brooklyn. She is survived by her husband, son (Lute Breuer), daughter (Clove Galilee) and a granddaughter (Bella Breuer). She was also survived by two siblings, Frank A. Reinprecht and Mrs. Patricia Adams, and various nieces and nephews.

== Selected awards ==
=== Obie Awards ===
- Best Performance, Mabou Mines Lear - 1990
- Best Performance, Hajj - 1983
- Best Performance, Through the Leaves - 1984
- Best Design (shared with Julie Archer), Vanishing Pictures - 1980
- Sustained Achievement, Mabou Mines - 1986

=== Villager Downtown Theater Awards ===
- Best Solo Performance, Hajj - 1990
- Best Director, Wrong Guys - 1981
- Best Director, Vanishing Pictures - 1980
- Best Ensemble, Shaggy Dog Animation - 1978

=== Other Awards ===
- For Lifetime Dedication to Not-For-Profit Theatre (2001)
- Cairo International Festival for Experimental Theatre: Certificate of Outstanding Merit for her "influential, pioneering role in experimental theatre" (2006)
- Edwin Booth Award: To the Artistic Directors of Mabou Mines for Contributions to Theatre (2007)
- Foundation for Contemporary Arts Grants to Artists award (2009)
- Otto René Castillo Award for Political Theatre (2010)
- USA Gracie Fellow in Theater Arts by United States Artists (2010)
- Inductee (posthumously) into the Off Broadway Hall of Fame by The Off Broadway Alliance (2014)

== Filmography ==
Year	Title	Role	Notes
1981	Strong Medicine	Eleanor	
1984	C.H.U.D.	Mrs. Monroe	
1986	Dead End Kids		
1987	Anna	Woman #1 / Woman Named Gloria	
1991	The Cabinet of Dr. Ramirez	Cathy's Mother	
1992	In the Soup	Mrs. Rollo	
1992	Mac	Burgess	
1993	The Ballad of Little Jo	Shopkeeper	
1993	Me and Veronica	Person on Ferry	
1995	Angela	Sleepwalker	
1996	Sleepers	Woman at Subway Station	
1996	The Crucible	Goody Osborne	
1996	Tales of Erotica		(segment "The Dutch Master")
1997	Mondo Plympton		Voice
2008	Nick and Norah's Infinite Playlist	Homeless Caroline	
2011	Portraits in Dramatic Time	Herself	(final film role)
