= A Piece of Monologue =

Play by Samuel Beckett

Three Occasional Pieces. [London]: Faber and Faber, [1982]. First English edition of A Piece of Monologue, Rockaby and Ohio Impromptu.

A Piece of Monologue is a fifteen-minute play by Samuel Beckett. Written between 2 October 1977 and 28 April 1979 it followed a request for a “play about death” by the actor David Warrilow who starred in the premiere in the Annex at La MaMa Experimental Theatre Club, New York on 14 December 1979.

== Synopsis ==
Diffuse light fades up on a room in which a white-haired old man – identified simply as Speaker – stands motionless facing a blank wall. To his left is a standard lamp the same height as the actor with a globe about the size of a human skull; it is faintly lit. Just visible to his extreme right is the white foot of a pallet bed. “[I]t is much like the room in the television play Ghost Trio, although without the mirror.” The man is wearing a white nightgown and white bed-socks. After a ten-second pause the actor begins speaking and continues without a break till the end of the play. All is lit dimly. This invites us, along with a lack of any specified internal staging to focus on listening as the primary way to experience the play.

Speaker “tells a ‘story’ of a man so much like himself that it is easy to suppose that he is simply speaking of himself in the third person" who is first seen staring out of a window at “that black vast.” He has been contemplating the length of his life, which he totals up to “two and a half billion seconds” or “thirty thousand nights.” (This works out to 79 years of seconds and 82 years of nights). He focuses at first on only two things, being handed around as an infant and the various funerals that have punctuated his time on earth. The birth/death dyad is announced in the opening line: Birth was the death of him." This pervades the play and appears in various forms throughout much of Beckett's writing.

Speaker goes on to describe the man’s efforts to light an old-fashioned oil lamp in great detail. The linguistic discipline and repetition of precise phrases lends a ritualistic quality to these sequences which end in reduced light as he lastly "turns wick low". This sequence of variations ultimately reduces to the single word: "lights" closer to ending the play. In the initial, larger variations he uses up three matches in the process each time.

Now able to see the man turns eastward to face a blank wall. This appears to be another nightly ritual. The wall that the man stands before used to be “covered with pictures” of once “loved ones” (an expression he doggedly avoids saying as Beckett employs ellipses each time this phrase is uttered, forcing the character to interrupt himself immediately after each utterance). He looks at specific marks left on the wall and remembers a photo of his father, one of his mother, one of them on their wedding day – Perhaps what he refers to right before the end as “the dead and gone” – and one of “He alone” which is likely one of himself – yet another, with his parents and possibly others of “the dying and the going.” These pictures have been “ripped from the wall and torn to shreds” though not in a single emotional scene, as with the character O in Film, but rather over a period of time and then swept “under the bed with the dust and spiders.” (Beckett manages to create a sense of their presence haunting the room. This seems increasingly likely as ghosts are mentioned in a sequence of lines leading to the closing section of the play.)

Speaker then recalls the "Room once full of sounds. Faint sounds. Fewer and fainter as time wore on." He links this to recollections of rain, which is falling at that moment as he states: "Rain some nights still slant against the panes. Even now." Rain is further utilized in funeral sequences to come.

The Speaker describes going to the window and lighting the lamp again in a truncated variation. For the third lamp-lighting a single lighted spill (a slender piece of wood or of twisted paper, for lighting lamps, etc.) is used rather than matches. An additional element is added with disappearing and reappearing hands and the globe. (Perhaps this is evocative a magic trick? A disappearing act as if one more verging on death?) Later follows the final mention of lighting the lamp with the aforementioned final, single-word variation "lights".

The action at an open grave is recalled in a series of variations and narrated in cinematic terms: “Umbrellas round a grave. Seen from above ... Thirty seconds ... Then fade.” The funeral is taking place in the pouring rain. The man describes watching someone speak at the graveside – (presumably the minister?) – but only “half hearing what he’s saying.” Confusion as to whose funeral gives way to indication that the funeral is of a woman, very likely that of his mother(?). The fact that Speaker corrects himself, “his way” becoming “Her way”, suggests that the death of this female loved one is perhaps the critical event of this partial and oblique story. Or, more accurately, the attempt to speak of this specific event and renounce it from memory is the most significant behaviour represented in the narrative.”

The text fragments from this point on. The narrator jumps back and forth from the funeral to the window to the lamp to the wall to his birth. The action does progress somewhat however: in the first mention of the funeral the grave is empty, in the second the coffin is “out of frame” and in the third the coffin is “on its way.”

== Interpretations ==
“[One] of Freud’s theories that had an impact on Beckett because it reinforced his own experience was that the agony of birth induced a primal anxiety in human beings.” Beckett claimed to have remembered his time in utero along with his own painful birth. The word ‘birth’ preoccupies Speaker. He returns to it over and over again describing graphically at one point, in as great a detail as he does the lighting of the lamp, how the word is said. This is an important moment and one that caused Beckett major problems when he came to adapt the piece into French since “no similar word is vocalised in this way in French.” This resulted in his omitting whole passages and “reduced the piece to a free version, shorter, entitled Solo.” “Parting the lips is both a condition for and a result of pronouncing the plosive consonant “b”; thrusting the tongue forward, more precisely, pushing it out through the parted lips and teeth, describes in turn the action involved in pronouncing the sound “th”... This connection links the parting of lips and thrusting forward of the tongue, necessary for the articulation of the word “birth,” with the actual act of birth. In other words, the pronunciation of this word is simultaneously the image or symbol of that which it signifies.”

There is also the familiar mathematical precision, which provides a structuring order to the old chaos. Not for the first time Beckett plays on the number three. There are three fully articulated attempts to light the lamp, three images of the advancing spectre of death, and three denials—‘No such thing as none’; ‘No such thing as no light’; ‘No such thing as whole’. And there are the multiples of six: six references to loved ones, six descriptions of the pictures which once adorned the now blank wall the speaker faces, six steps in the ritual” and six uses of the word ‘birth’, three included in the expression – or a slight variation of the opening line: “Birth was the death of him.”

“The isolated man in A Piece of Monologue ... has ruthlessly cut himself off from his past, ‘exorcising’ his ‘so-called’ loved ones by removing their photographs, tearing them up and scattering them ... In seeking ‘less to die’, in deliberate acts of emotional desiccation, he attempts to abjure the memories of himself in former relationships. As he destroys the photographs that reduce his once-loved mother and father to grey voids, and him to another, he tries to obliterate the memories that connect him with life and intimacy. Nothing remains but dim recollection and an anticipated funeral to mark the end of his slow death mark from birth to oblivion”... Hovering as Old Father Time in his shroud, he is ‘waiting on the rip word’ ... to avaunt his ‘so-called loved ones’ and his ‘ghastly grinning’ self.

Kristin Morrison argues, "The rip word in A Piece of Monologue is `begone', that word by which the speaker dismisses from his life that which he has always really wanted.” Linda Ben-Zvi considers the word as "the pun on R.I.P., requiescat in pace (rest in peace), which suggests that death is the final way of ripping the dark." The Faber Companion to Samuel Beckett (p 365) proposes that ‘love’ is the “rip word” because his ripping the photographs of his “loved ones” from the wall “fails to bring about the consummation desired.” This demonstrates the multiple possibilities of interpretation that make Beckett so richly challenging to anyone attempting to reach fixed conclusions regarding specific meanings.

Beckett effectively attempts to achieve on stage what he has previously achieved in fiction: to allow the two parts of the self to exist simultaneously. There is Speaker framed on stage who does not move (effectively a Tableau Vivant) – he resembles a photograph – and then there is the man in his story. F. Scott Fitzgerald's remark, "Action is character," has never been truer than in this short play.

“The play ends on the growing pull of the image of death: ‘Treating of other matters. Trying to treat of other matters. Till half hears there are no other matters. Never were other matters. Never two matters. Never but the one matter. The dead and the gone. The dying and the going. From the word go. The word begone’. The two issues, birth and death, ultimately become only death. From birth, the beginning—‘the word go’—the presence of death is constant, just as the word ‘go’ is part of the word ‘begone.’”

== Background ==
In August 1977, the actor David Warrilow, who had had such a resounding success with the adaptation of The Lost Ones wrote to Beckett asking him if he would write a solo piece for him to perform. After clarifying what exactly he was after Beckett declined: “My birth was my death. But I could not manage 40 min. (5000 words) on that old chestnut. Not with it now within reach.” The day afterwards he did however sit down and attempt a piece with the opening words: ‘My birth was my death.’ Written in the first person singular; it was provisionally entitled ‘Gone’.

“It broke down ... after a few thousand groans” but he considered it salvageable and returned to it in January 1979 when Martin Esslin wrote to him to ask if he had an unpublished work that could appear in The Kenyon Review. He added a set of stage directions to what had been up till then simply a monologue and, on his seventy-third birthday, he posted copies to both Esslin and Warrilow. He considered it “unsatisfactory ... I do not expect you to use it,” he wrote to Warrilow.

“The piece drew on childhood memories: “his father teaching him to light a match on his buttocks; the various operations involved in lighting an old-fashioned oil lamp ... what his mother had told him about how he was born just as the sun was sinking behind the larches ‘new needles turning green’; a gleam of light catching the large brass bedstead that had stood in his parents’ bedroom.” He had also recently calculated his own age in days and incorporated a figure of “Twenty five thousand five hundred and fifty dawns” in his initial draft.

A few days after Beckett began work on ‘Gone’ he arranged for his whole house to be painted “grey like the proprietor” and, on his return from a trip to Germany seeing the walls now bare and uncluttered, he chose to let them remain that way. As James Knowlson puts it in Damned to Fame (p 650): “Life here emulated art, or at least echoed the mood that inspired it.”

== Related texts ==
=== Breath ===
The oxymoron "Birth was the death of him" evokes a fusion of the two events. We find this in Breath, in which a stage littered with rubbish is accompanied by a faint cry, followed by inspiration, silence, expiration, another cry and silence again. End of piece.

=== Krapp's Last Tape ===
To access his memories (i.e. to see the wall) the man in Monologue has first to turn on the lamp. In Krapp's Last Tape before Krapp can access his he needs to locate the appropriate tape and switch on the machine. Today, when digital technologies accentuate the process of the externalisation of memory begun with the invention of written language, these plays are more relevant than ever.
