= One Evening =

One Evening may refer to:

- "One Evening" (short story), a story by Samuel Beckett included in The Complete Short Prose 1929-1989
- "One Evening", a song by The Jesus Lizard from Head
- "One Evening (Feist song)", a song by Feist from Let It Die
