= Stories and Texts for Nothing =

Literary work

- First illustrated edition (1958)
- Author: Samuel Beckett
- Illustrator: Avigdor Arikha (illustrated 1st edition)
- Language: English
- Genre: short story

Stories and Texts for Nothing is a collection of stories by Samuel Beckett. It gathers three of Beckett's short stories ("The Expelled," "The Calmative," and "The End": all written in 1946) and the thirteen short prose pieces he named "Texts for Nothing" (1950–1952). All of these works are collected in the Grove Press edition of Beckett's complete short prose. They were originally written in French and published in 1955 by Les Éditions de Minuit as Nouvelles et Textes pour rien, with a second edition illustrated edition published by the same publisher in 1958.

== The Stories ==
All three stories deal with the displacement or expulsion of old men who are forced to leave their modest lives in search of a new niche where they might fit.

=== "The Expelled" ===
Though the story deals with rejection and the forcible ejection of the narrator, it begins with the narrator's complaints regarding the difficulty of counting the stairs down which he had to go once he was expelled. The story follows the narrator as he tries to find a new place for himself, all the while presenting his bitterness and anger towards many things in the world. The resentment in the story is not directed at the injustices of being thrown out of what we assume is the narrator's home, but of the more general injustices of life, such as being born at all, for which the only consolation the narrator finds is in distractions like mathematics.

=== "Texts for Nothing" ===
None of the thirteen "Texts for Nothing" were given titles; they present a variety of voices thrust into the unknown. According to S. E. Gontarski: "What one is left with after the Texts for Nothing is 'nothing,' incorporeal consciousness perhaps, into which Beckett plunged afresh in English in the early 1950s to produce a tale rich in imagery but short on external coherence." Thus these texts, when compared to the three earlier stories, as well as "First Love", may be interpreted as representing a movement in Beckett's writing from modernism to postmodernism. Unlike the earlier stories, these pieces are no longer completed stories but shards - "aperçus of a continuous unfolding narrative, glimpses at a never to be complete being (Narrative)." This idea is voiced in text 4, where the narrator admits stories are not required any more:

There's my life, why not, it is one, if you like, if you must, I don't say no, this evening. There has to be one, it seems, once there is speech, no need of a story, a story is not compulsory, just a life, that's the mistake I made, one of the mistakes, to have wanted a story for myself, whereas life alone is enough.
