= Cascando =

Radio play by Samuel Beckett

First American edition of Beckett's translation from the French of his radio play, Cascando. New York: Grove Press, 1968

Cascando is a radio play by Samuel Beckett. It was written in French in December 1961, subtitled Invention radiophonique pour musique et voix, with music by the Franco-Romanian composer Marcel Mihalovici. It was first broadcast on France Culture on 13 October 1963 with Roger Blin (L'Ouvreur) and Jean Martin (La Voix). The first English production was on 6 October 1964 on BBC Radio 3 with Denys Hawthorne (Opener) and Patrick Magee (Voice).

"The play was originally to be called Calando, a musical term meaning 'diminishing in tone' (equivalent to diminuendo or decrescendo), but Beckett changed it when ORTF officials pointed out that calendos was the slang word for camembert in French." The term cascando ('cascades') involves the decrease of volume and the deceleration of tempo.

Cascando is also the title of a 1936 poem by Beckett.

== Structure ==
"Beckett first wrote out the complete part for Opener, inserting the spaces for Voice and Music, before writing out the complete part for Voice. The music was then composed separately by Marcel Mihalovici, who, of course, at that time had the text as guidance, and only then were the three parts combined and produced in the studio by [the director]."

"The duration of the individual interjections for Voice and Music correspond to each other, so that when Voice speaks for ten seconds, for instance, Music too is held for the same amount of time. Furthermore, when Voice repeats his foregoing account, Music too plays a slightly varied repeat of its previous phrase. There is a musical crescendo at the end of the play, and a gradual fade-out, which corresponds to the build-up of anticipation in Voice's documentation of his protagonist's progression towards his goal and Voice's own longing for the close of the story to end all stories."

== Synopsis ==
The play opens with a familiar Beckettian theme, the search to put an end to language: "—story . . . if you could finish it . . . you could rest . . . sleep . . . not before". “The shape of the narrative itself is indicative of the mind already in the process of degenerating towards an impasse. Voice alternates between talking about the story-telling itself, or the need to find the story to end all stories, and narrating [what it hopes will be that final] story."

The persona has been divided up. "Voice is aware that his own identity is bound up with his fiction ('I’m there … somewhere') and that it is his own quest to find himself.” Why words and music? Perhaps to emphasise the limitations of words, a life-long preoccupation with Beckett. Broadly speaking words convey meaning, music feeling; Opener is trying to combine these two elements to tell a more rounded version of his story. "If Voice is Opener's own mental voice, and Music is his emotional faculty, then Woburn may be the objectification of Opener himself."

Cascando involves a fear of finishing in the wrong place, or in the wrong way. At the end of the play the three 'characters' enjoy a moment when they 'speak' in unison. "As though they had linked their arms," says Opener who then pronounces his creation, "Good." The play ends, the actors pack up and go home. For many it may not be a satisfactory ending – it lacks closure – but it has reached an end, Woburn drifts out to sea. The open ending is a mainstay of the film industry epitomized by Shane's riding off into the distance at the end of George Stevens's 1953 film of the same name. This is as close as Beckett comes to one of his characters sailing off into the sunset.

Beckett has said of Cascando: "It is an unimportant work but the best I have to offer. It does I suppose in a way show what passes for my mind and what passes for its work."

=== Opener ===
"His opening statement, 'It is the month of May . . . for me,' suggests, as critics have remarked, that it is the time for creation or "ritual renewing". Approximately two thirds of the way into the play, he says 'Yes, correct, the month of May. You know, the reawakening'. He repeats, a little later, 'Yes, correct, the month of May, the close of May,' but at this point he reminds us that the days are long in this month, so that their ends are always postponed.”

At one point Opener reveals how he has been ridiculed by people saying, "it's in his head". He is a writer/story-teller – his lives in his head – but the locals (his critics) obviously don't appreciate his work. He used to object but he doesn't even try and explain anymore, he doesn't even respond to them nowadays. He's resigned himself to the fact that he is misunderstood. He recalls painful trips he used to make, one to the village and a second to the inn. Woburn too has developed a fear of interacting with people.

Opener identifies strongly with Woburn, It may be that rather than simply a story this is a plan of action, a run through of what he either intends to do or wishes he could do, a Thanatos wish. Part of him wants to give up but the writer in him (personified as Voice) can't give up. Opener's remark, "I'm afraid to open. But I must open. So I open," is all too familiar Beckett reasoning, echoing the Unnamable's "you must go on, I can't go on, I'll go on", the leitmotif which Beckett embraces in all his work. Like other Beckett characters (e.g. May in Footfalls), writing, although clearly not the most pleasant of activities, sustains him: “they don’t see what I live on.” (Roberta Satow's article on "repetition compulsion" makes interesting reading here: https://web.archive.org/web/20100117153938/http://www.robertasatow.com/psych.html).

We think of Samuel Beckett as a writer but in reality that was only one aspect of the whole man. His output was certainly not large and he was plagued with long bouts of ‘Writer's block', always stuck "between the limitations of words and the infinity of feelings" as Kafka put it, and yet this aspect of him kept pushing him a little further from the shore, metaphorically speaking. As he got older and older he must have considered that every work might be his last. He must have thought that with Stirrings Still; as its title suggests, after all this time his imagination was still stirring, still clinging on for dear life.

=== Voice ===
When instructed by Opener Voice begins mid-sentence, reminiscent of Krapp's taped diary entries. When told to stop he does in the same way. Cutting off the voice makes it sound like Voice is pre-recorded and Opener is simply switching on and off, like Macgillycuddy in Rough for Radio I, but this isn't the case.

Voice jumps straight to describing his ongoing need to complete a last story, to say what needs to be said, and keep on with this tale until its end; then he will be able to "rest [and] sleep … not before." Voice is desperate. Like Henry in Embers he's never been able to finish any of his stories and he knows he won't have any peace until he does.

Throughout the play Voice returns to these thoughts, willing himself on, determined this will be his final attempt, convinced this is the right story. The ache in his voice is tangible – "Come on! Come on!" – as if everything has been invested in this story's ending. Towards the close of the play Opener joins him in this geeing-on closely followed by Voice confirming, "—at last … we're there" acknowledging that he has not been entirely alone in the creative process.

=== Woburn ===
Beckett told his friend, the scholar Alec Reid that this play is "about the character Woburn who never appears". The story that Voice devises concerns this man (whose very name "intimates a stream of woe"). In the original French text, he is called Maunu ("naked miseries"). Woburn/Maunu has had a long life and a misfortunate one which has changed him but he's still recognizable as the man he once was five or even ten years earlier.

He hides in a shed until nightfall so no one he used to know notices him. When he sees through the window it's getting dark he slips out. Two routes present themselves: “right the sea … left the hills … he has the choice.” “Voice delivers his lines in a rapid, panting, almost unintelligible stream, very much like Mouth in Not I. The man makes his decision and heads down the steep slope towards the sea. Beckett refers to the road as a "boreen" which gives us a specific location for the story, Ireland. All of a sudden he falls flat on his face in the mud. Woburn, we learn, is a huge man, dressed in an old coat with a broad brimmed hat jammed on his head. He stumbles along with the aid of a walking stick and so it takes some effort to get back on his feet.

Vague memories pass through his head, a cave, a hollow, some sort of shelter. He's been here before, a long time ago perhaps but he is still anxious in case he is identified; the night is too bright and the beach offers no cover but he's in luck, there's not a soul about. He goes down again, this time onto the sand. He can hear the sea now. It represents peace. He gets up but has to struggle on knee-deep in the sand. He reaches the stones, falls, heaves himself up. He tries to hurry. In the distance he can see the lights of an island.

Woburn finds the shell of a boat. It has "no tiller … no thwarts … no oars" but he drags it free and in doing so slips once more, this time into the bilge. He manages to cling on, possibly to the gunwale, and it drags him towards the island but that's not his goal. He passes it and allows himself to be pulled out to sea (reminiscent of the character in The End). He's there, "nowhere", in the middle of nowhere.

But peace eludes him – he keeps clinging on, torn between the will to live and the need to die – and so the end eludes Voice – desperate for sleep, desperate to be done – who keeps hanging on to the end of his story waiting for it to end but incapable of actually ending it. He is unable to give himself up, as Beckett wrote in Murphy, to "the positive peace that comes when something gives way ... to the Nothing."

=== Music ===
Voice has two strands, the story about Woburn and his personal need to complete this story. Music never accompanies the story itself, only those parts of the text where Voice is self-referential. However, when music follows the Woburn story it reflects what has just been said, it extracts the emotional component from it and presents it in isolation. It is as if Opener has just finished reading the text Voice has written and this is his emotional response to it.

There are very few musical cues/clues in the text. In the original French "libretto", as Vivian Mercier calls the text, there are only two 'musical' stage directions: “brève” (“brief”), used twice and “faiblissant” (“weakening”) which occurs only once. Mercier fancifully calls Cascando, along with Words and Music, "a new genre – invisible opera."

Voice's story is “accompanied by surges of non-verbal consciousness, the swell of emotions expressed in the music.” In correspondence with Claus Zilliacus, Mihalovici, who composed the original score, made it clear that he considered his music to be a character: “For Cascando … it was not a matter of a musical commentary on the text but of creating, by musical means, a third character, so to speak, who sometimes intervenes alone, sometimes along with the narrator, without however merely being the accompaniment for him.” but Ruby Cohn maintains that “it actually functions like background music." The tape of that first broadcast "was accidentally erased. This is especially unfortunate since Beckett took an active part in the rehearsals."

Humphey Searle's approach was to work with leitmotifs: "The chief motif, 'Woburn', would, Humphrey thought, be associated with the flute. Other motifs would be the 'island' and 'the journey', one linked with ethereal light and space, the other with restlessness and images of falling, getting up again, walking with a stick and so on. Some of these were humorous - 'same old stick ... same old broadbrim' - some darkly agitated."

A more recent version was composed by Martin Pearlman on a commission by the 92nd Street Y in New York for the Beckett centennial (2006). Lloyd Schwartz of the Boston Phoenix wrote that "Pearlman's evocative music seemed so right for these unsettling plays, it's now hard for me to imagine them without it."

== Composers ==
“Although the general contract specifies that Cascando should not be performed without Mihalovici's music," a number of other composers have worked on various productions and have created their own works based on the play.

=== To accompany a radio/stage production ===
Lodewijk de Boer: Toneelgroep Studio / NOS, 1970
Philip A. Perkins: Univ. of the Pacific, ( for electric guitar and other sounds) 1971 List of music students by teacher: T to Z
Philip Glass: Mabou Mines, 1975 (Apmonia entry on Glass)
Wayne Horvitz: Theater for Your Mother, 1979 (for trumpet and vocalists)
Humphrey Searle: Produced by: Katherine Worth for UL-AVC, 1984
William Kraft: co-production of Voices International and Horspiel Studio lll, WDR, 1989
Peter Jacquemyn: BRT, 1991
Gerard Victory: RTÉ radio broadcast, 1991
Dan Plonsey: Three Chairs Productions, 2002
Obadiah Eaves: Division 13 Productions, 2003
David J (founding member Bauhaus/Love and Rockets): Devaughan Theatre, 2005
David Tam: WKCR in association with Columbia University Arts Initiative, 2006
Martin Pearlman: 92nd Street Y Poets’ Theatre in association with Nine Circles Chamber Theater, 2006
Paul Clark: Gare St Lazare Players Ireland, RTÉ radio broadcast, 2006

=== Concert pieces ===
Elisabeth Lutyens: Cascando, for contralto, solo violin and strings, 1977
Charles Dodge: Cascando, 1978 (Dodge used electronic sounds for Voice and Music, while retaining a human voice for the part of Opener).
Richard Barrett: I Open and Close, 1988
William Kraft: Suite from Cascando for Flute, Clarinet, Violin, Cello and Piano, 1988
Lidia Zielinska: Cascando for actor and double mixed choir, 1983/91
Elaine Barkin: An Experiment in Reading, 1992
Gráinne Mulvey: Woburn Struggles On for orchestra, 1996
Pascal Dusapin: Cascando, for flute (+ piccolo), oboe (+ Cor anglais), clarinet, bassoon, French horn, trumpet (+ piccolo trumpet), trombone, double bass, 1997
John Tilbury (piano) / Sebastian Lexer (electronics): Cascando, 2001
Scott Fields (cello, tenor saxophone, percussion, electric guitar), "Cascando," 2008
Bálint Bolcsó, "Cascando Sketch," 2009
