= How It Is =

1961 novel by Samuel Beckett

How It Is is a novel by Samuel Beckett first published in French as Comment c'est by Les Editions de Minuit in 1961. The Grove Press (New York) published Beckett's English translation in 1964. An advance text of his English translation of the third part appeared in the 1962 issue of the Australian literary journal, Arna.

L'Image, an early variant version of Comment c'est, was published in the British arts review, X: A Quarterly Review (1959), and is the first appearance of the novel in any form.

Beckett had a particularly difficult time composing How It Is (then referred to as Pim), writing in an April 1960 letter: "I have only a rough (though 4th or 5th) version in French and am not at all sure I can bring it any further. If I can't, I'll throw it away." While the notebooks containing these rough drafts have not yet been made publicly available through the Samuel Beckett Digital Manuscript Project, it's been noted that they're filled with heavy revisions and key structural elements of the text didn't emerge until late in the composition process.

The novel is a monologue by the narrator as he crawls through endless mud, recalling his life separated into three periods. The title is Beckett's literal translation of the French phrase, comment c'est (how it is), a pun on the French verb commencer or "to begin".

== Structure ==
The text of How It Is lacks punctuation and is broken into fragments of various length (the bits and scraps murmured forth when the panting stops). These fragments have been referred to as strophes, and possess a fragmentary poetic structure which Beckett would also later use in works such as "Worstward Ho" and Ill Seen Ill Said. The poetic structure of the work has been noted to be accentual in the English version of the work, and tonic in the French.

The text features unusually heavy repetition of words and phrases. Some of those most commonly repeated include phrases like "good moments", "movements of the lower face no sound", and "I quote it as I hear it."

The book is divided into three parts, and those parts themselves vary significantly. Part One is possibly the most conventionally narrated, while Part Two features numerous ambiguities, embedding of scenes within scenes, and apparently paradoxical details, and Part Three features deeply fragmented narration, and a turn towards flawed logic ("fatal logique de raison il m’en reste") and wild hypotheticals.

== Synopsis ==
The text is divided into three parts:

1 ("before Pim")

The solitary narrator finds himself in the mud and dark, unsure of how he got there. His journey is abundant with images from a life above, including scenes involving things such as a woman and religious instruction in childhood. His only belonging is a sack filled with tins and a tin-opener, which are lost after the bursting of the sack. Part One ends with his accidental discovery of another.

2 ("with Pim")

The narrator cleaves to this creature, forming a couple. He names the creature "Pim", at the same time naming himself "Bom". Bom is excited to discover that Pim is capable of speech, and begins to engage in acts of physical violence in order to make Pim sing and provide images of the life above that Bom is no longer able to see on his own. Pim vanishes under ambiguous conditions.

3 ("after Pim")

The narrator returns to his earlier solitude but without motion in the mud-dark. He postulates that there must be several others like him and Pim. As the attempted explanation however requires a constant accumulation of ad hoc hypotheses, he acknowledges the wish for a simpler explanation. Only the mud, the dark, and his existence in it remain certainties.

In a letter (April 6, 1960) to Donald McWhinnie of the BBC Radio Drama Company, Beckett explained his strange text as the product of a "'man' lying panting in the mud and dark murmuring his 'life' as he hears it obscurely uttered by a voice inside him... The noise of his panting fills his ears and it is only when this abates that he can catch and murmur forth a fragment of what is being stated within... It is in the third part that occurs the so-called voice 'quaqua', its interiorisation and murmuring forth when the panting stops. That is to say the 'I' is from the outset in the third part and the first and second, though stated as heard in the present, already over."

== Theme ==
The theme may be the struggle of form to emerge from formlessness using Leopardi's sense of the world as mud (E fango è il mondo) and therefore, a kind of purgatory, as well as Dante's image of souls gulping mud in the Stygian marsh of the Inferno (Canto VII, 109–126, in Palma's translation):

Set in the slime, they say: 'We were sullen, with
no pleasure in the sweet, sun-gladdened air,
carrying in our souls the fumes of sloth.
Now we are sullen in this black ooze' – where
they hymn this in their throats with a gurgling sound
because they cannot form the words down there.

Dante's Belacqua and his foetal position also are referenced in How It Is and the following quotation is an example of the work's unpunctuated, dense, and poetic style:

the knees drawn up the back bent in a hoop the tiny head near the knees curled round the sack Belacqua fallen over on his side
tired of waiting forgotten of the hearts where grace abides asleep

== Influence ==
Jean-Luc Godard's 1962 short film "La Paresse" begins and ends with shots of Eddie Constantine and Nicole Mirel reading Beckett's work, as well as of the text itself.

The novel served as inspiration for Miroslaw Balka's 2009 work, How It Is, in Tate Modern's Turbine Hall.

The character of the 'Angsal', the mysterious angel in Jerry Hunter's mud-soaked novel Ebargofiant (Y Lolfa, 2014) is an intertextual reference to Beckett's novel.
