= Five Fizzles for Samuel Beckett =

EP by Barry Guy
- Released: 2014
- Recorded: January 11, 2009
- Studio: St. Catherine's Church, Vilnius, Lithuania
- Genre: Free improvisation
- Label: NoBusiness Records; NBEP 2
- Producer: Danas Mikailionis, Valerij Anosov

Five Fizzles for Samuel Beckett is a live solo double bass EP by Barry Guy. It was recorded on January 11, 2009, at St. Catherine's Church in Vilnius, Lithuania, and was released in 2014 in limited quantities by NoBusiness Records.

In an interview, Guy explained that the music was inspired by eight short texts, also titled Fizzles, written by Samuel Beckett during the 1960s and 70s:

Each 'Fizzle' is a short compressed outburst—literary chamber music of great power and beauty. It occurred to me that these 'outbursts' could form the basis for little improvisations, each dedicated to particular bass colours and articulations... I find them to be a motivator for precise thinking and musical rhetoric.

Guy initially recorded the piece for his 1993 solo album Fizzles, and it became a staple in his solo concerts.

== Reception ==
Professional ratings
Review scores
Source	Rating
All About Jazz	5/5 stars
The Free Jazz Collective	5/5 stars
Tom Hull – on the Web	B+

In a five-star review for All About Jazz, John Sharpe wrote: "While Beckett's pieces can be analyzed in terms of phrase length and language, Guy has further parameters at his disposal: speed, volume, and the choice of whether to attack the strings with bow, fingers or other implements. These he combines to realize five concise contrasting exhibitions of dazzling technique which deliver a visceral impact."

The Free Jazz Collective's Eyal Hareuveni also awarded the album five stars, and stated: "Guy moves instantly and organically between explorative search of the double bass resonating, timbral characteristics, expanding it with his extended techniques while using sticks, mallets and strings-less bow, to gentle, touching segments and intense struggles with the bull fiddle. Always with superb, highly expressive musicality that distills centuries of music making into timeless, very personal art."

Derek Taylor of Dusted Magazine noted: "The after effect is an immediate desire for more with realization that there's no more to be had. Perhaps that's part of the larger point in light of the title Guy attached the piece. Beckett's storied minimalism and brevity applied to musical means."

Writing for The Absolute Sound, Jeff Wilson recommended the album, commenting: "Building compositions around the texts of Samuel Beckett is tricky enough... but how does one embody the spirit of Beckett's words with a single instrument and no words? Guy has described each song as 'a short compressed outburst,' and he creates those outbursts by aggressively scraping the bow across the strings, slapping the strings with both hands, percussively striking the strings with a bow and other objects, creating eerie high notes with harmonics, wedging the bow between the strings and then plucking, and bowing above and below the bridge—everything except playing a walking bass line, in other words."

In an article for JazzWord, Ken Waxman remarked: "the program is as spacious and brutal as any of the Irish writer's creations. Double stopping while pumping and pummeling his string set, Guy has created an autonomous salute where his single double bass creates more emotional resonance than exists in the author's laconic works... Guy honors Beckett by expressing his own (musical) language."

Stewart Smith of The Quietus called the recording "inspired" and "masterful," and wrote: "The results are remarkable, from the keening Easter European melodies and rusty hinge abstractions of 'Fizzle One', to 'Fizzle II's evocation of a gentle breeze blowing through a cane field."

The New York City Jazz Record's Clifford Allen stated that the album "renders in solemn, pedal-actuated detail the stark, resonant action of being 'alone'," and commented: "The music is raw, naked and immediate, albeit missing the wry absurdity that might truly connect it with its dedicatee."

== Track listing ==
All compositions by Barry Guy. Track timings not provided.

1. "Fizzle I"
2. "Fizzle II"
3. "Fizzle III"
4. "Fizzle IV"
5. "Fizzle V"

== Personnel ==
- Barry Guy – double bass
