= David Warrilow =

English actor (1934–1995)

- Born: 28 December 1934; Stone, Staffordshire
- Died: 17 August 1995 (aged 60); Paris, France

David Warrilow (28 December 1934 – 17 August 1995) was an English actor best known as one of the "finest interpreters of Samuel Beckett’s work".

== Life and career ==
A shoemaker's son born in Stone, Staffordshire, Warrilow studied at the University of Reading under James Knowlson, Beckett’s biographer. In 1967 in Paris, he joined Réalités, editing the magazine for eleven years. He co-founded the Mabou Mines theater group in 1970. Three years later, he starred in a theatrical adaptation of Beckett’s The Lost Ones, directed by Lee Breuer and Thom Cathcart. In 1984, he directed a cinematic adaptation of the novella.

At Warrilow's request, Beckett wrote A Piece of Monologue for him in 1979, impressed by the actor’s bilingualism. "In August 1977", writes James Knowlson, "the actor, David Warrilow, who had had such a resounding success with the adaptation of The Lost Ones, wrote to Beckett asking him if he would write a solo piece for him to perform. Questioned as to what he had in mind, Warrilow wrote back saying that he 'had an image of a man standing on stage lit from above. He’s standing there in a sort of cone of light. You couldn't see his face and he’s talking about death.' Beckett's reply began: 'My birth was my death.'" The play, directed by the actor, premiered in New York in December 1979.

In 1981 Warrilow played the "Reader" in Beckett's Ohio Impromptu under Alan Schneider’s direction. First performed in Columbus, Ohio, the play toured New York City, Paris, London and Edinburgh. In 1983 in Paris, he starred in Beckett’s That Time and Catastrophe, both plays directed by Alan Schneider. In 1989 in London, Warrilow was Krapp in Beckett’s Krapp's Last Tape, directed by Antoni Libera.

Between 1986 and 1995, the actor worked with Paris-based theater director Joël Jouanneau, interpreting the texts of Samuel Beckett, Thomas Bernhard, Joseph Conrad, Robert Pinget, and Robert Walser. In 1991 Warrilow played the role of Stanford Garland in the film Barton Fink, directed by Joel Coen. A year after his performance in Beckett’s Company, a theatrical reading directed by Jouanneau at the Petit Odéon in Paris, Warrilow died of complications of AIDS in 1995, aged 60.

== Filmography ==
- 1975: The Lost Ones (directed by Lee Breuer)
- 1980: Simon (directed by Marshall Brickman) - Blades
- 1981: Strong Medicine (directed by Richard Foreman) - Doctor
- 1984: Le Dépeupleur (directed by David Warrilow) (adaptation of novella by Samuel Beckett)
- 1987: Radio Days (directed by Woody Allen) - Roger
- 1988: Bright Lights, Big City (directed by James Bridges) - Rittenhouse
- 1988: Milan noir (directed by Ronald Chammah) - Moran
- 1989: L'Orchestre rouge (directed by Jacques Rouffio) - Piepe
- 1991: Buster's Bedroom (directed by Rebecca Horn) - Mr. Warlock
- 1991: Barton Fink (directed by Joel Coen) - Garland Stanford
- 1992: Mirror On The Moon (directed by Leandro Katz) - as Corrigan.
- 1994: Les Derniers Jours d'Emmanuel Kant (directed by Philippe Collin) - Immanuel Kant (final film role)

== Theatre ==
- 1978: The Lost Ones by Samuel Beckett, directed by Lee Breuer and Thom Cathcart, Théâtre Gérard Philipe (Saint Denis)
- 1983: Solo, cette fois by Samuel Beckett, directed by K. D. Codish, Théâtre National de Strasbourg, Théâtre Gérard Philipe (Saint-Denis)
- 1983: ‘’The Beckett Plays’’ by Samuel Beckett, directed by Alan Schneider, Harold Clurman Theatre
- 1984: Akhnaten by Philip Glass, directed by Achim Freyer, Stuttgart State Theatre
- 1985: Marat/Sade by Peter Weiss, directed by Walter Le Moli, MC93 Bobigny
- 1986: Catastrophe and Impromptu d'Ohio by Samuel Beckett, directed by Pierre Chabert, Théâtre Renaud-Barrault
- 1987: L'Hypothèse by Robert Pinget, directed by Joël Jouanneau, Festival d'Avignon
- 1988: Minetti by Thomas Bernhard, directed by Joël Jouanneau, Théâtre des Treize Vents
- 1990: Les Enfants Tanner by Robert Walser, directed by Joël Jouanneau, Théâtre de la Bastille
- 1990: En attendant Godot by Samuel Beckett, directed by Joël Jouanneau, Théâtre Nanterre-Amandiers
- 1992: Le Marin perdu en mer by Joël Jouanneau, Théâtre de l'Athénée-Louis-Jouvet
- 1992: Au cœur des ténèbres by Joël Jouanneau, adaptation of Heart of Darkness by Joseph Conrad, Théâtre de l'Athénée-Louis-Jouvet
- 1993: L'Inquisitoire by Robert Pinget
- 1994: La Dernière Bande by Samuel Beckett, directed by Joël Jouanneau, Théâtre de l'Athénée-Louis-Jouvet
- 1994: Compagnie by Samuel Beckett, directed by Joël Jouanneau, Petit Odéon

== Distinctions ==
- 1975: Obie Award for "The Lost Ones"
- 1990: Chevalier de l'Ordre des Arts et Lettres
- 1994: Prix du Syndicat de la critique : Prix du meilleur comédien du Syndicat de la critique for Compagnie by Samuel Beckett
