= Diarmuid Delargy =

Northern Irish painter

Diarmuid Delargy RE RUA
- Born: 1958 (age 67–68); Belfast, Northern Ireland
- Education: Slade School of Fine Art
- Children: 3
- Elected: Aosdána (1999)
- Website: Diarmuid Delargy on Instagram

Diarmuid Delargy RE RUA (/ˈdiːərməd dəˈlɑːrdʒi/; born 1958) is a Northern Irish artist, active in painting, printmaking, etching, lithography and sculpture.

== Early life ==
Delargy was born in Belfast in 1958.

== Career ==
Delargy studied at the Ulster Polytechnic and the Slade School of Fine Art in London.

He has also completed a suite of prints based on Samuel Beckett's From an Abandoned Work and collaborated with the poet Paul Muldoon. He won a gold medal at the European Large Format Print Exhibition in Dublin in 1991.

According to the Bankside Gallery, "His practice places great emphasis on the etching surface and explores the existential dilemma between Art and Extinction. His work is derived from a cross fertilisation between several media including drawing, painting and sculpture. His prints are totally chiaroscuro, exploring the subtleties of tone potential."

== Personal life ==
Delargy lives and works in Sligo with his wife and three children.
