= Mabou Mines =

American experimental theatre company

- Formation: 1970
- Founders: David Warrilow, Lee Breuer, Ruth Maleczech, JoAnne Akalaitis, and Philip Glass
- Type: experimental theatre company
- Location: New York City
- Artistic director: Mallory Catlett
- Website: www.maboumines.org

Mabou Mines is an experimental theatre company founded in 1970 and based in New York City.

== Founding and history ==
Mabou Mines was founded by David Warrilow, Lee Breuer, Ruth Maleczech, JoAnne Akalaitis, and Philip Glass, at the house of Akalaitis and Glass near Mabou Mines, Nova Scotia. In 2020, the company announced Carl Hancock Rux and Mallory Catlett as its new co-Artistic Directors.

The company began as a resident company at Ellen Stewart's La MaMa Experimental Theatre Club in the East Village.

In 1986, the company won an Obie Award for Sustained Excellence for its theatrical contributions to the Off-Broadway community.

As the company stated in a 1990 press kit, "The artistic purpose of Mabou Mines has been and remains the creation of new theatre pieces from original texts and the theatrical use of existing texts staged from a specific point of view. Each member is encouraged to pursue his or her artistic vision by initiating and collaborating on a wide range of projects of varying styles, developing them from initial concept to final performance. This process is intense and often lengthy. While the director of a Mabou Mines work is responsible for its concept and its basic structure, the ultimate production reflects the concerns and the artistic input of all its collaborators."

In 2005, Mabou Mines was among 406 New York City arts and social service organizations to receive part of a $20 million grant from the Carnegie Corporation, which was made possible through a donation by New York City mayor Michael Bloomberg.

The company also runs a Resident Artist Program, which has included award-winning artists Lynn Nottage, Carl Hancock Rux, and Basil Twist. In 2020, Rux and his co-artistic directors formed a new arts residency program called Suite Space, dedicated to developing the work of multidisciplinary artists of color. The program convenes annually and has included the works of composer Tamar-Kali, choreographer Edisa Weeks, musicians Mary Prescott, Tariq Al-Sabir, and Marcelle Lashley, among others. The company's associate artist-in-residence program includes Carrie Mae Weems, Nona Hendryx, Dianne Smith, Basil Twist and several others.

== Production history ==
- Faust 2.0 (2019)
- Animal Magnetism - ON TOUR AT THE WUZHEN THEATRE FESTIVAL (2018)
- Gospel at Colonus (2018)
- Medea (in Development, 2018)
- Glass Guignol (2017)
- A Coffin in Egypt (2017)
- Imagining The Imaginary Invalid (2016)
- La Divina Caricatura (2013)
- We Would Find Landscapes (2012)
- Finn (2010)
- PATAPHYSICS PENYEACH: SUMMA DRAMATICA & PORCO MORTO (2009)
- Song For New York: What Women Do While Men Sit Knitting (2007)
- Lucia's Chapters of Coming Forth by Day (2007)
- A Prelude to Death in Venice (Harvey's Version) (2007)
- Summa Dramatica: A Pataphysical Acting Lesson (2005)
- Red Beads (2005)
- Mabou Mines DollHouse (2003, adapted from Henrik Ibsen's A Doll's House)
- Cara Lucia (2003)
- Ecco Porco (2002)
- Animal Magnetism (2000)
- Belén-A Book of Hours (1999)
- Happy Days (1996)
- The Red Horse Animation (1996, reconstruction/revival)
- Pootanah Moksha (1996)
- Peter and Wendy (1996)
- An Epidog (1995)
- Reel To Real (1994)
- Mother (1994)
- The MahabharANTa, and Selected Stories from the Insectiad (1992)
- The Bribe (1991)
- The Quantum (1991)
- In the Jungle of Cities (1991)
- The Miller Series (1990, for radio)
- Mabou Mines Lear (1990)
- The B. Beaver Animation (1990, reconstruction/revival)
- The Gospel at Colonus (1988)
- Sueños (1987)
- Worstward Ho (1986)
- The Kafka Parables (1986, for radio)
- Help Wanted (1986)
- C.E.O (1986)
- The Interview Series (1985, for radio)
- Starcock (1985)
- It's a Man's World (1985)
- Flow My Tears, The Policeman Said (1985)
- Through the Leaves (1984)
- Pretty Boy (1984)
- Imagination Dead Imagine (1984)
- The Joey Schmerda Story (1983, for radio)
- Hajj (1983)
- Company (1983)
- Cold Harbor (1983)
- The Keeper Radio Series (1982)
- Wrong Guys (1981)
- Dead End Kids (1980)
- Vanishing Pictures (1980)
- Sister Suzie Cinema (1980)
- Easy Daisy (1980, for radio)
- A Prelude to a Death in Venice (1980)
- Southern Exposure (1979)
- Mercier and Camier (1979)
- Shaggy Dog Animation (1978)
- Dressed Like An Egg (1977)
- The Saint and the Football Player (1976)
- The B. Beaver Animation (1975)
- Cascando (1975)
- The Lost Ones (1975)
- Mabou Mines Performs Samuel Beckett (1974)
- Send / Receive / Send (1973)
- Music for Voices (1972)
- Arc Welding (1972)
- Play (1971)
- Come and Go (1971)
- The Red Horse Animation (1970)
