= Lee Breuer =

American theatre director (1937–2021)

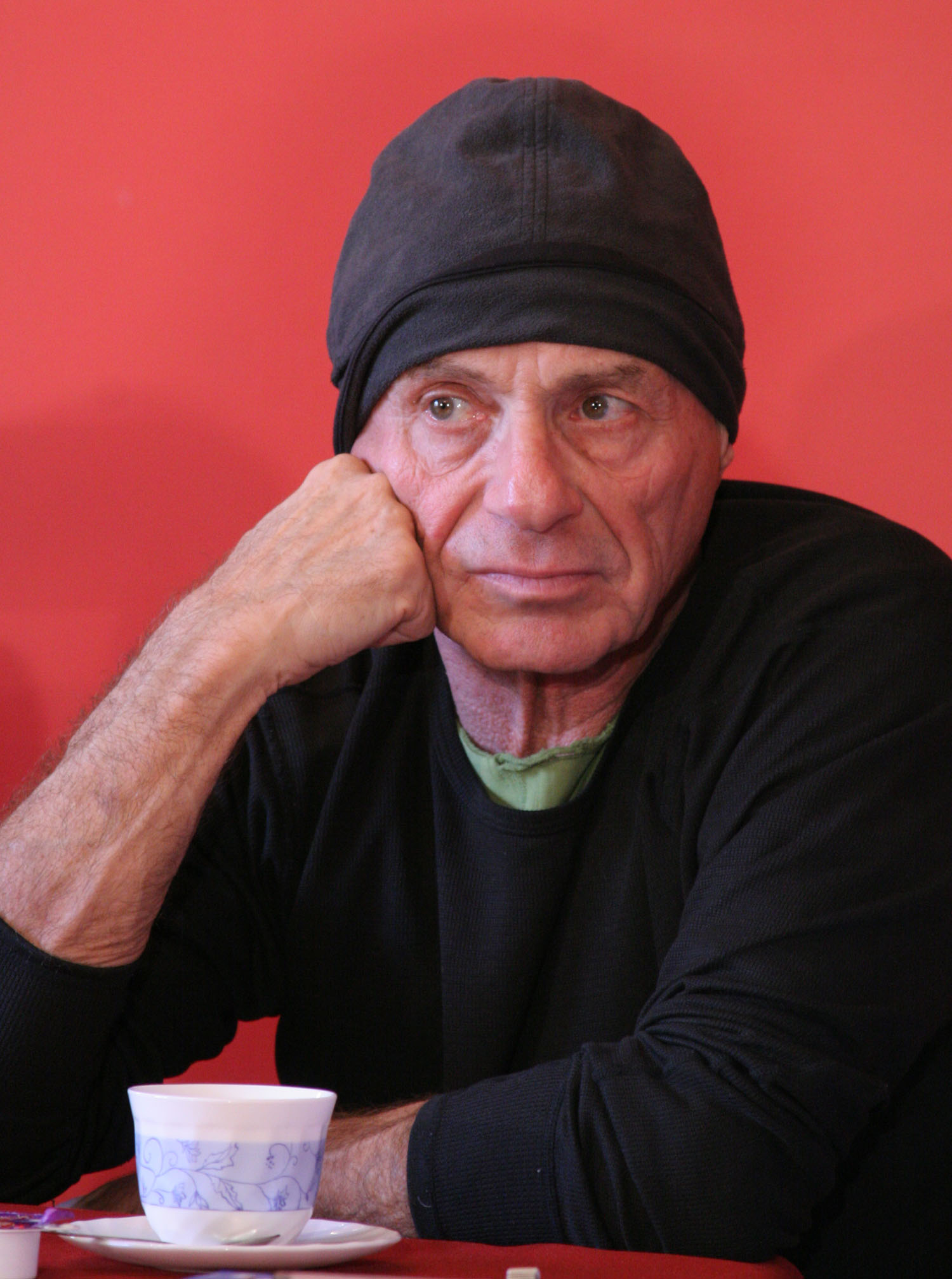
- Born: Esser Leopold Breuer; February 6, 1937; Philadelphia, Pennsylvania, U.S.
- Died: January 3, 2021 (aged 83); New York City, New York, U.S.
- Education: University of California, Los Angeles
- Occupations: Playwright; director; academic; writer
- Spouses: Ruth Maleczech (m. 1978; died 2013) Maude Mitchell (m. 2015)
- Children: 5

Esser Leopold "Lee" Breuer (February 6, 1937 – January 3, 2021) was an Obie Award-winning and Pulitzer-, Grammy-, Emmy- and Tony-nominated American playwright, theater director, academic, educator, filmmaker, poet, and lyricist. Breuer taught and directed on six continents.

== Career ==
Breuer was a founding co-artistic director of Mabou Mines Theater Company in New York City, which Breuer began in 1970 with colleagues Philip Glass, Ruth Maleczech, JoAnne Akalaitis, David Warrilow, and Frederick Neumann. Since the birth of the company, Breuer worked with Mabou Mines.

In 2013, Breuer directed the La Divina Caricatura: Part I The Shaggy Dog which was co-produced by Mabou Mines. In 2005, Breuer's previous Mabou Mines production Red Beads, was adapted by Breuer from a Russian folk story, created in collaboration with puppeteer Basil Twist and composer Ushio Torikai. Of the September 2005 New York City premiere, the New York Times critic wrote "...theater as sorcery; it is a crossroads where artistic traditions meet to invent a marvelous common language. It is a fairy tale, a puppet play and a chamber opera… amazing work."

Mabou Mines Dollhouse, a deconstruction of the Ibsen classic, won 2004 Obie Awards for Best Director and Best Performance. The production toured nationally and internationally. Breuer directed high definition video adaptation of stage production for Arte television France, which was aired throughout Europe.

Much of Breuer's work with Mabou Mines premiered at The Public Theater (NYC) under the patronage of the late Joseph Papp, and at the La Mama Experimental Theater Club under the patronage of Ellen Stewart. These include his Obie-winning adaptation of three works by Samuel Beckett: Play, Come and Go and The Lost Ones.

Breuer authored/directed Mabou Mines' trilogy, Animations, including The B Beaver, The Red Horse and The Shaggy Dog Animation, which was awarded the Obie for Best Play in 1978. In 1980, Breuer received two Obies for writing and direction of his play, A Prelude to a Death in Venice. He also wrote and directed An Epidog, the winner of the President's Commission Kennedy Center-American Express Award for Best New Work.

=== The Gospel at Colonus ===
Breuer's best-known work is The Gospel at Colonus, a Pentecostal Gospel rendering of Sophocles' Oedipus at Colonus, created with composer Bob Telson, starring Morgan Freeman and Clarence Fountain. It premiered at the Brooklyn Academy of Music's "Next Wave Festival". It was later performed on Broadway at the Lunt-Fontanne Theater in 1988 for which he was nominated for a Tony Award. The production received numerous awards, including a Pulitzer Prize nomination (1988), an Obie Award for Best Musical (1984), and an Emmy.

The Gospel at Colonus would go on to performances worldwide (Paris, Spoleto, Edinburgh, Moscow, Barcelona, London, Avignon). It was recreated for the 70th Anniversary of New York's legendary Apollo Theater for two weeks in the fall of 2004 starring Charles S. Dutton and Jevetta Steele.

=== Productions ===
In 1981, with Ruth Maleczech, Lee Breuer directed The Tempest for Joseph Papp's Shakespeare in the Park, starring Raul Julia. Breuer and Maleczech's daughter Clove Galilee played "Young Miranda" in the production.

Breuer's music-theater collaborations with Bob Telson include Sister Suzie Cinema (featuring 14 Karat Soul), which premiered at The Public Theater and was televised on the PBS series Alive from Off Center; and The Warrior Ant, which premiered at BAM in 1988.

Breuer has directed 13 Obie Award-winning productions over a period of more than 40 years including: David Warrilow in The Lost Ones (1974); Bill Raymond in A Prelude to Death in Venice (1979); Ruth Maleczech in Hajj (1986); Yoshida Tamamatsu in The Warrior Ant (1990); Ruth Maleczech, Isabel Monk, Karen Kandel and Greg Mehrten in Mabou Mines Lear (1991); Karen Kandel in Peter and Wendy (1997); and Maude Mitchell in Mabou Mines Dollhouse (2004). His involvement outside of the U.S. includes directing Yi Sang Counts to Thirteen by Sung Rno, which had its debut in South Korea at the Seoul Theater Festival 2000.

Lee taught an acting workshop in New Delhi, India during the summer of 2011 where he wrote and directed a workshop production of La Divina Caricatura. Divina is a Bunraku pop-opera that uses puppetry and draws from the traditional format of Indian epics such as the Mahabharata.

== Personal life ==
Breuer was born in Philadelphia. He studied English at the University of California, Los Angeles. Breuer married Maleczech in 1978. They had two children (Clove Galilee and Lute Breuer) and remained legally married until her death in 2013, but spent much of the latter period separated. He also had three children (Alexander Tiappa Klimovitsky, Mojo Lorwin, and Wah Mohn) by other relationships. Ms. Mitchell and Mr. Breuer met in 1999 at Sundance Theater Lab and became partners; they married in 2015. In addition to Mitchell, he was survived by his daughter, Clove Galilee; his sons, Lute Ramblin Breuer, Alexander Tiappa Klimovitsky, Mojo Lorwin and Wah Mohn; daughters-in-law Jenny Rogers and Martha Elliot and three grandchildren. Breuer's children all grew up to be artists. Like their mothers — Maleczech, Klimovitskaya, Lorwin and Leslie Mohn (died 2007) — all had collaborated with him.

== Death ==
Breuer died at his home in Brooklyn Heights on January 3, 2021, at age 83. He had advanced kidney disease and metastatic lung cancer.

== Selected works ==
=== Plays ===
Title	Role	Year	Ref
The Warrior Ant (La Divina Caricatura play cycle)	Playwright	1988	
An Epidog (La Divina Caricatura play cycle)	Playwright	1996	
Ecco Porco (La Divina Caricatura play cycle)	Playwright	2002	
Peter and Wendy	Lyricist	1996	
Mabou Mines Dollhouse	Adaptor	2003	
Red Beads	Playwright	1993	
The MahabharANTa	Playwright	1992	
Gospel at Colonus	Playwright	1982	
The Quantum	Playwright	1991	
Hajj	Playwright	1982	
Lear	Playwright	1990	
The Saint and the Football Players	Playwright	1976	
The Lost Ones (Samuel Beckett)	Adaptor	1976	
Red Horse Animation (Animations Trilogy)	Playwright	1972	
B-Beaver Animation (Animations Trilogy)	Playwright	1974	
Shaggy Dog Animation (Animations Trilogy)	Playwright	1978	
A Prelude to Death in Venice	Playwright	1980	
Sister Suzie Cinema	Playwright	1980	
The Line	Playwright	1959	
A Play	Playwright	1958	
The Wood Complains	Playwright	1957	

=== Publications ===
Title	Publisher	Year	Ref
Animations: A Trilogy for Mabou Mines	Performing Arts Journal Publications	1979	
Red Horse Animation	The Theatre of Images, Drama Book Specialists	1977	
A Prelude to Death in Venice	Theatre Communications Group	1982	
Sister Suzie Cinema: The Collected Poems and Performances, 1976-1986	Theatre Communications Group	1987	
The Warrior Ant: Poems	Vincent FitzGerald & Co.	1992	
La Divina Caricatura: A Fiction	Green Integer	2002	
Gospel at Colonus	Theatre Communications Group	1989	
Travailler de Bois	Puck: La point critique	2010	
Porco Morto	The Drama Review	2009	
The Wall (short fiction)	Westwinds Magazine	1959	
In the city (short fiction)	San Francisco Review	1961	
How We Work	Performing Arts Journal	1977	
B-Beaver Animation	From the Other Side of the Century Collection. Sun & Moon Press	1998	

=== Awards, et al ===
2011 Named USA Ford Fellow in Theater Arts by United States Artists

2011 Elliot Norton award for "Best Touring Production" Mabou Mines DollHouse

2008 Honored by the Cairo International Experimental Theatre Festival

2008 XI Festival Iberoamericana de Teatro de Bogota 2007

2008 Herald Archangel Award, Edinburgh Festival

2007 Edwin Booth Award presented to the artistic directors of Mabou Mines by the Doctoral Theatre Students Association at the Graduate Center, CUNY.

2006 Chevalier of the Order of Arts and Letters, Ministry of Culture of France

2004 OBIE Award for 'Direction' for MABOU MINES DOLLHOUSE

1997 OBIE Award for 'Best Production' to PETER AND WENDY

1994 Fund for New American Plays Award, Best American Play, for THE EPIDOG (Breuer)

1986 OBIE Award for 'Sustained Achievement' to Mabou Mines

1985 National Institute for Music Theater Award 'Outstanding Achievement' to GOSPEL AT COLONUS

1985 Los Angeles Drama Critics Circle Award for Best Concept to GOSPEL AT COLONUS

1985 Los Angeles Dramalogue Award for Best Direction and Text to GOSPEL AT COLONUS

1985 National Black Programming Award for Best Production Communicating Excellence to Black Audiences to GOSPEL AT COLONUS 1985 National Institute of Music Theater's Award for the Advancement of Music Theater

1984 OBIE Award for 'Best Musical' to GOSPEL AT COLONUS

1984 National Gospel Association Award 'Outstanding Production' to GOSPEL AT COLONUS

1984 Brandeis University Creative Arts Awards Citation in Theatre Arts to Mabou Mines for 'extraordinary artistic achievement,' re: script for HAJJ (Breuer)

1983 National ASCAP Popular Song Award for GOSPEL AT COLONUS lyrics

1983 United Gospel Association Award for Best Production to GOSPEL AT COLONUS

1983 American Theater Wing Joseph Maharam Award 'Consistently Excellent Collaborative Design'

1981 Villager Downtown Theatre Award to Mabou Mines for Outstanding Season

1980 OBIE Award to Lee Breuer for his script and direction of A PRELUDE TO DEATH IN VENICE.

1980 San Francisco Critics' Circle Award: Best Touring Production to A PRELUDE TO DEATH IN VENICE

1980 Villager Downtown Theatre Award for 'Best Musical' to SISTER SUZIE CINEMA

1979 Los Angeles Dramalogue Critics' Award to Lee Breuer (Direction) for THE LOST ONES

1978 OBIE Award for Best Play to Lee Breuer for THE SHAGGY DOG ANIMATION

1978 Villager Downtown Theatre Award to THE SHAGGY DOG ANIMATION

1978 Soho News Award for Best Ensemble to THE SHAGGY DOG ANIMATION

1974 OBIE Award for 'General Excellence' to Mabou Mines

1958-9 UCLA 'Best Play' Award to A PLAY and THE LINE

1958 Samuel French Award to A PLAY

==== Nominations ====
1988 Tony Nomination for Best Book - GOSPEL AT COLONUS (officially declined)

1988 Pulitzer Prize Nomination for Best Play - GOSPEL AT COLONUS

1987 NAACP Image Award Nomination - GOSPEL AT COLONUS

1986 Grammy Award Nomination for Best Theatrical Album - GOSPEL AT COLONUS

1986 Emmy Award Nomination for Best Direction (with Tod Browning) - GOSPEL AT COLONUS

In 1998, Breuer, was awarded an honorary degree from California Institute of the Arts.

==== Fellowships ====
2011 USA Ford Fellow in Theater Arts by United States Artists

2006 Bunting Fellowship - Radcliffe College, Cambridge, MA

2003 Fulbright Fellowship - Greece

2001 Asian Cultural Council - Thailand, Study 2000 Asian Cultural Council - Seoul, Korea, Workshop

1997-2001 John D. & Catherine T. MacArthur Foundation Fellowship

1995 Asian Cultural Council - China, Teaching at Dramatic Institute in Beijing

1993 Japan-United States Friendship Commission - Japan, Research and Tour Planning

1992 Asian Cultural Council - China

1992 Arts International - China, Teaching and Travel

1992 Arts International - Bali, Rehearsal and Travel

1990-91 CIES Counsel for International Exchange of Scholars - North and South India

1985 Rockefeller Foundation Playwriting Fellowship

1984 McKnight Foundation Playwriting Fellowship

1983 Japan-United States Friendship Commission Exchange Fellowship

1982 National Endowment for the Arts Playwriting Fellowship

1979 Rockefeller Foundation Playwriting Fellowship

1978 Creative Artists Public Service (CAPS) Fellowship

1978 National Endowment for the Arts Playwriting Fellowship

1977 Guggenheim Fellowship

=== Teaching ===
2011 Towsen University, Baltimore Maryland, Development workshop

2011 Duke University, North Carolina, Development workshop

2010 Master Classes, Moscow and St. Petersburg

2010 National Theatre of Scotland, Glasgow

2009 National Theatre of Scotland, Edinburgh

2009 Guest Faculty Shanghai University

2006 Guest Lecturer University of Thessaloniki

2004-06 Guest teaching, Yale University School of Drama, Brown University

1986-89 co-chair of Directing Department, Yale University School of Drama

1995-99 Professor of Theater, Stanford University 1995-99 Associate Professor

1994 UC Santa Cruz

1992-93 Associate Professor, Arizona State University West

1977-80 Associate Professor, Yale University School of Drama

1981 Harvard University Extension (Writers & Directors Seminar)

1981 Experimental Wing, New York University
