= Fizzles (album) =

Live album by Barry Guy
- Released: 1993
- Recorded: September 1991
- Studio: Kirche Blumenstein, Switzerland
- Genre: Free jazz
- Length: 1:09:40
- Label: Maya Recordings; MCD9301
- Producer: Barry Guy, Maya Homburger

Fizzles is a live solo bass album by Barry Guy. It was recorded in September 1991 at Kirche Blumenstein in Switzerland, and was released in 1993 by Maya Recordings.

In an interview, Guy explained that the track titled "Five Fizzles (For S.B.)" was inspired by eight short texts, also titled Fizzles, written by Samuel Beckett during the 1960s and 70s:

Each 'Fizzle' is a short compressed outburst—literary chamber music of great power and beauty. It occurred to me that these 'outbursts' could form the basis for little improvisations, each dedicated to particular bass colours and articulations... I find them to be a motivator for precise thinking and musical rhetoric.

The piece became a staple in Guy's solo concerts, and he recorded it again for the 2014 album Five Fizzles for Samuel Beckett.

== Reception ==
Professional ratings
Review scores
Source	Rating
AllMusic	4/5 stars
The Penguin Guide to Jazz	4/4 stars
The Virgin Encyclopedia of Jazz	4/5 stars

In a review for AllMusic, Brian Olewnick praised Guy's "sheer jaw-dropping dexterity" and "pure touch," and wrote: "Fizzles is an often pyrotechnic, sometimes quite moving solo bass performance... As in his orchestral writing, Guy leavens the abstraction with occasional doses of traditional playing... often, Guy is subjecting his instrument to all manner of unspeakable torment, gratingly whipsawing his bow or plucking strings with a ferocity that leaves the listener worried about the capacity of his finger and wrist muscles... After the final, almost ridiculously explosive track, the exhausted listener can only nod his thanks."

The authors of the Penguin Guide to Jazz Recordings awarded the album 4 stars, and stated: "Fizzles... has a quiet charm that reveals itself over repeated listenings... Guy concentrates on the tiniest details with an almost hallucinatory intensity... 'She Took the Sacred Rattle and Used It' is one of Guy's finest moments as an instrumentalist."

== Track listing ==
All compositions by Barry Guy.

1. "Free Fall" – 6:32
2. "Fil Rouge" – 2:33
3. "Hilibili Meets... the Brush" – 10:45
4. "Five Fizzles (For S.B.)" – 10:40
5. "Invention/The Bird of Infinity" – 8:18
6. "Afar" – 2:50
7. "...But the Clouds..." – 5:54
8. "Tout Rouge" – 2:59
9. "Still" – 8:09
10. "Toujours Rouge" – 1:46
11. "She Took the Sacred Rattle and Used It (To Ray A. Young Bear)" – 9:14

== Personnel ==
- Barry Guy – double bass, chamber bass
