= The Capital of the Ruins =

1946 piece of reportage by Samuel Beckett

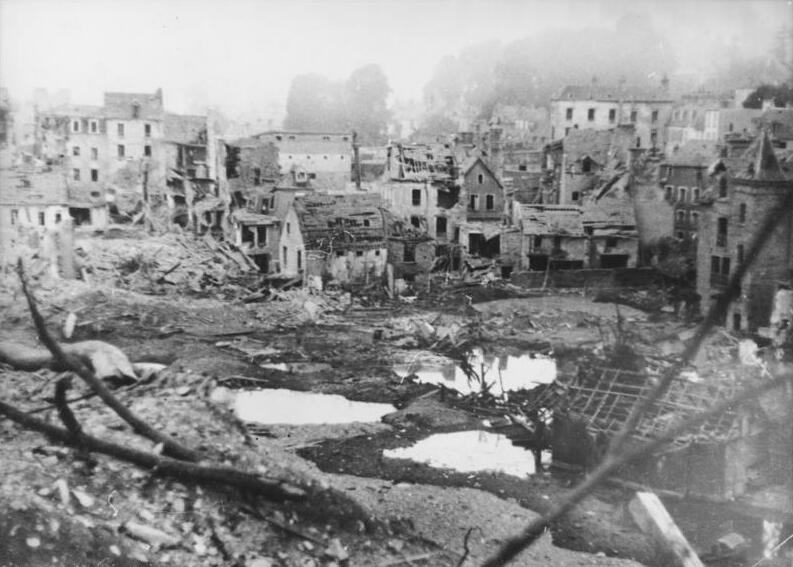
Saint-Lô in Summer 1944

"The Capital of the Ruins" is a short piece of reportage by Samuel Beckett written in 1946.

== Discussion ==
Originally written for broadcast by Irish radio, it deals with the Irish hospital in Saint-Lô. The title of the piece derives from a booklet of photographs of the bombed-out city entitled Saint-Lô, Capitale des Ruines, 5 et 7 Juin 1944.

The text is dated 10 June 1946 signed by Samuel Beckett, but there remains a controversy whether it was broadcast or not. It was discovered among the archives of Radio Telefís Éireann in 1983 and published in 1986 by Eoin O'Brien in The Beckett Country, and later that same year in As No Other Dare Fail: For Samuel Beckett on His 80th Birthday by His Friends and Admirers. It is also collected in Beckett's Complete Short Prose 1929–1989, published in 1995.
