= Imagination Dead Imagine =

Short story by Samuel Beckett

"Imagination Dead Imagine" is a short prose text by Samuel Beckett first published in French in Les Lettres nouvelles in 1965. Its first English publication was a translation in The Sunday Times in 1965 followed by a trade edition by Beckett's London-based publisher, Calder and Boyars, later that year.

== Plot ==
Developed as an offshoot of the longer prose work, All Strange Away, and consistent with Beckett's preoccupation with cylinders and closed spaces in his work of the 1960s, the text explores "the theme of the dying imagination yet conscious of its own activity". Two white bodies are situated back to back inside a skull-like rotunda or vault. On the verge of extinction, the imagination of an unspecified being succeeds in imagining two bodies enclosed in a silent and motionless black and white environment subject to varying degrees of heat and cold with a brief interlude of grey.

According to the painter Avigdor Arikha, an intimate of the author, the rotunda was inspired by the Val-de Grâce church in Paris which Beckett could see from his study window. In an imaginative transposition of reality, Beckett reduced the actual dome to a skull-sized vault that "has the ring of bone to it". The bodies of the two figures remain inert while their left eyes open in turn and stare for lengthy periods. The imagination of the invisible and nameless narrator constantly shifts position to examine, like a miniature camera, the two foetus-like figures in their stark environment. In effect, the figures "are like embryos waiting either for birth or for extinction". The text ends with the identities of the two figures appearing to merge to form a "white speck lost in whiteness".

== Adaptations ==
A 1984 theatrical adaptation of the work pioneered the use of holography in live theater. Produced by the experimental theater group Mabou Mines, the work was directed by Ruth Maleczech with holographic design by Linda Hartinian. Hartinian later explained that such a design was considered impossible as "a hologram could only be seen by one person at a time. I didn't depend totally on the 3 dimensional effect, I used theatre. I ran the audience in a cone, because I do know enough physics to understand optical laws". Reviewing for The New York Times, critic Mel Gussow described the production as "a paradigmatic example of the Mabou Mines mastery of technology in the name of art".

In April 1986, at MIT's List Visual Arts Center, Maleczich and Hartinian staged a slightly revised production, with Beckett's text spoken on tape by veteran actress Ruth Nelson.

== Bibliography ==
- Ackerley, C.J. and Gontarski, A.E. (2004). The Grove Companion to Samuel Beckett. New York: Grove Press ISBN 0-8021-4049-1
- Knowlson, James (1997). Damned to Fame. London: Bloomsbury ISBN 0-7475-3169-2
