= Ping (nickname) =

Ping is a nickname of:

- Ping Bodie (1887–1961), Major League Baseball player
- Ping Bodie (American football) (1896–1981), first Italian-born player in the National Football League
- Ping Burke, American Negro league pitcher in the 1930s
- Ping Duenas (1930–2009), Guamanian politician
- Chris Exciminiano (born 1988), Filipino basketball player
- Ping Gardner, American Negro league pitcher in the 1920s and '30s
- Panfilo Lacson (born 1948), Filipino politician
- Ping Medina (born 1983), Filipino actor
- Crispin Diego Remulla (born 1990), Filipino politician
- Theodore Stark Wilkinson (1888–1946), US Navy vice admiral and recipient of the Medal of Honor
