= Church of St. Catherine, Vilnius =

Church of St. Catherine
- Lithuanian: Šv. Kotrynos bažnyčia
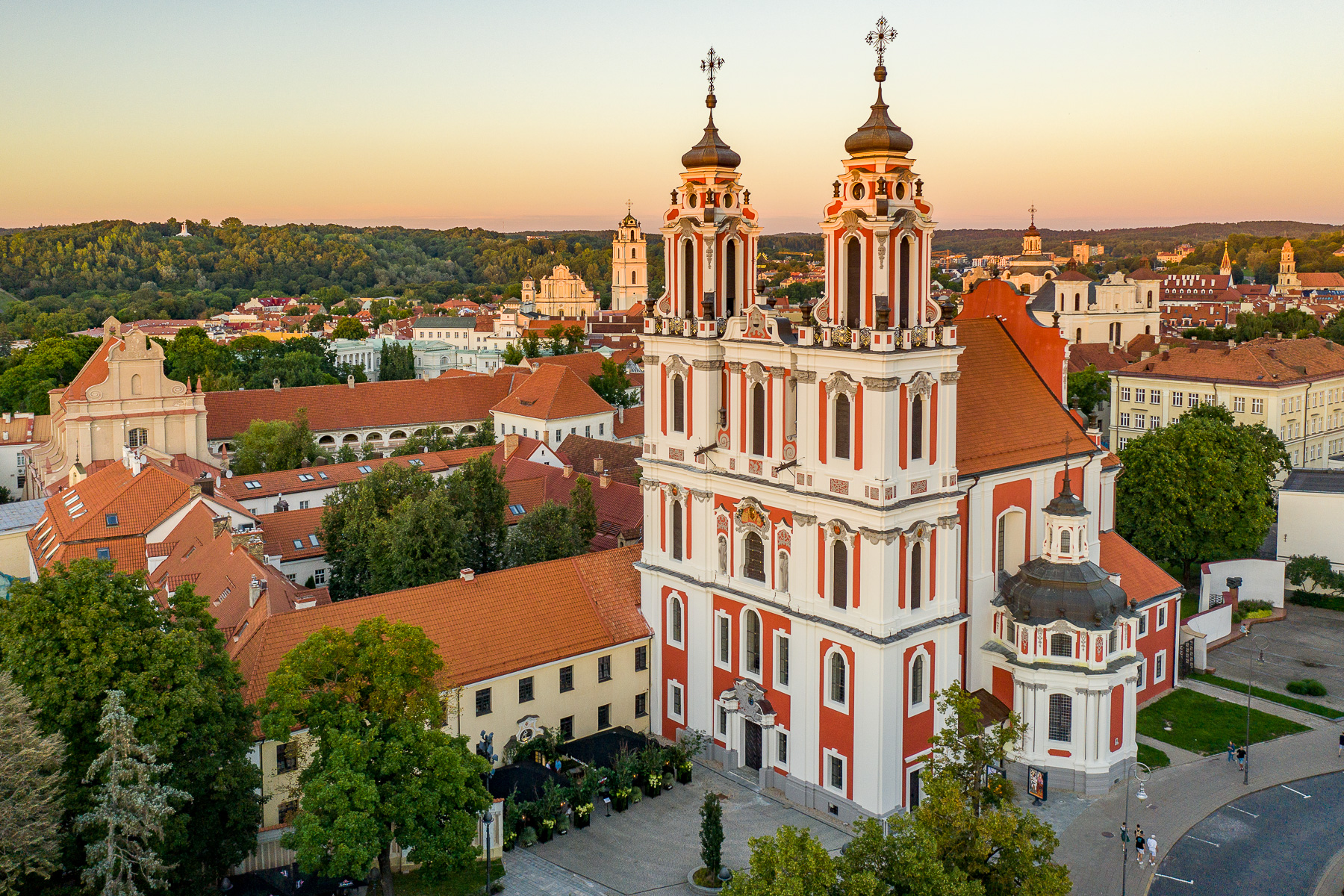
- Main façade of St. Catherine's in 2023
- Click on the map for a fullscreen view
- 54°40′54.40″N 25°16′52.40″E
- Location: Vilnius
- Country: Lithuania
- Denomination: Catholic
- Tradition: Latin Church
- Religious order: Order of Saint Benedict
- Website: www.kazimiero.lt

History
- Founder: Jan Karol Chodkiewicz
- Dedication: Saint Catherine of Alexandria

Architecture
- Functional status: Active
- Architect: Johann Christoph Glaubitz (reconstruction 1741–1753)
- Architectural type: Conventual church
- Style: Baroque
- Years built: 1618–1625

Specifications
- Materials: plastered masonry

Administration
- Archdiocese: Roman Catholic Archdiocese of Vilnius

UNESCO World Heritage Site
- Official name: Vilnius Old Town
- Type: Cultural
- Criteria: Cultural: (ii), (iv)
- Designated: 1994
- Reference no.: 541
- UNESCO region: Europe

The Church of St. Catherine (Lithuanian: Šv. Kotrynos bažnyčia, Polish: Kościół Św. Katarzyny) is a Roman Catholic church in Vilnius' Old Town. It was founded by the Hetman of the Grand Duchy of Lithuania and Voivode of Vilnius Jan Karol Chodkiewicz in 1618.

== Architecture ==
The church is a Baroque-style single-nave church with a Baroque chapel of the Divine Providence on the southwest corner. The main façade, towers and pediments have Rococo ornamentation. Inside there are 9 late Baroque style altars with sculptural Rococo decoration, from the 18th century, a pulpit and a baptistery with Baroque and Rococo sculptures and high reliefs, and a memorial plaque to J. and E. Valavičius (1769).

== History ==
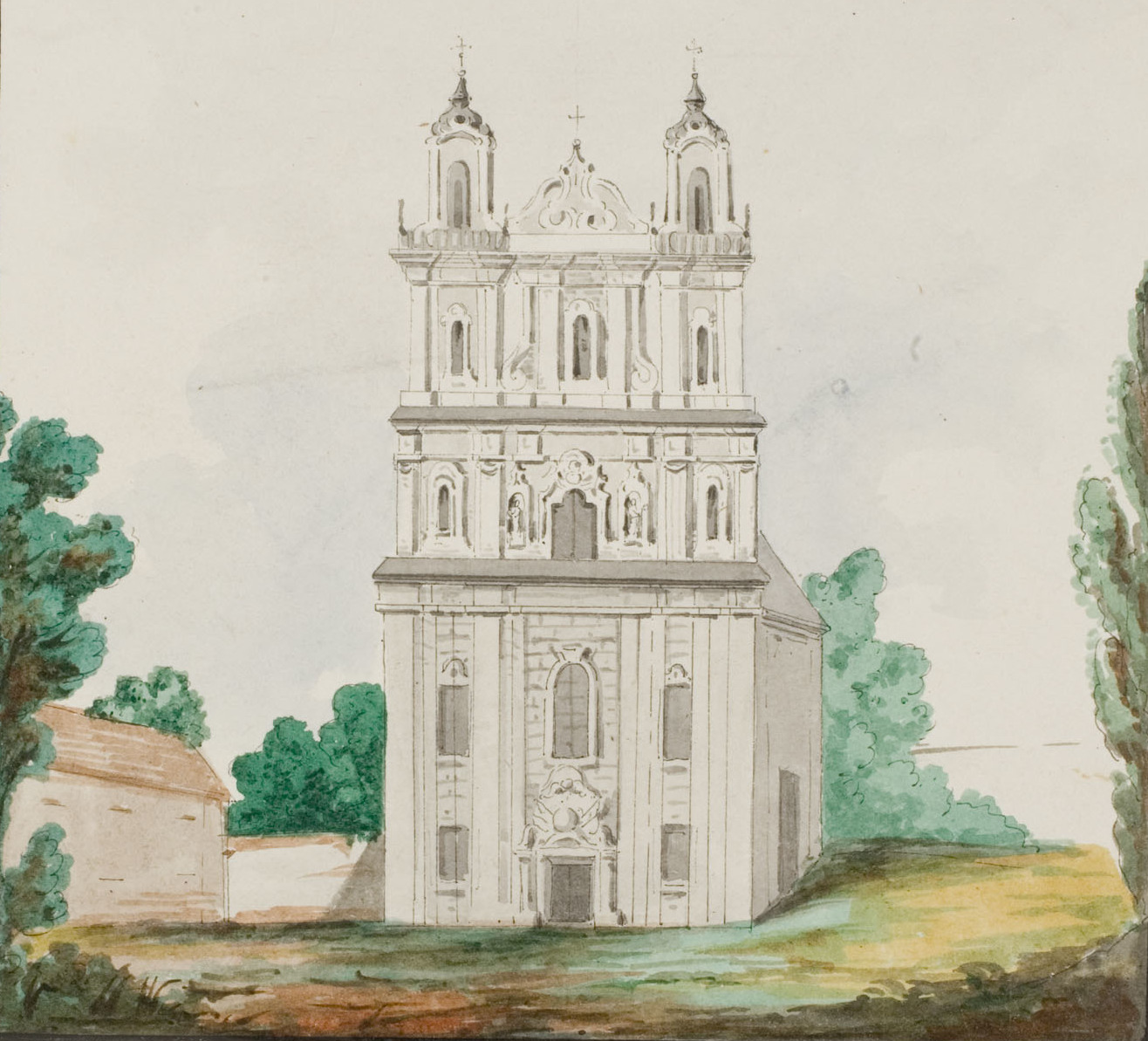
Church of St. Catherine in 1835

In 1618, the Grand Hetman of Lithuania Jan Karol Chodkiewicz started the construction of a small church for the Benedictine nuns in Vilnius. Consecrated in 1632. In the 1660s, during the war with Russia, the church was burnt down, rebuilt in 1670-94 (a new main facade with lower towers) and consecrated in 1703. However, the Great Fire of Vilnius in 1737 did not spare the Benedictine church and monastery. After the fire, the reconstruction of the church was led by the architect Johann Christoph Glaubitz, who was contracted by the mother superior of the monastery, Joana Sibilė Reitenovaitė. He designed the church's current appearance: the towers were raised (up to 5 storeys), ornate pediments were built, vaulted ceiling was redone, and the chapel was rebuilt. 1752-53 The altar and the chapel were decorated by the artists J. Herdegen, J. Woszczyński, John and Joseph Hedel. In 1759, 15 paintings by Szymon Czechowicz were brought from Kraków to St Catherine's Church and the Benedictine monastery (surviving paintings are housed in the Lithuanian National Museum of Art). The church was severely damaged in 1812 during the French invasion of Russia and later during World War II and many valuable works of art were lost. In 1945, the remaining nuns were deported by the Soviet authorities and a warehouse was set up in the church, which later was transferred to the Vilnius Art Museum. After Lithuania regained independence the church has been under restoration and adapted for cultural activities and since 2002 it was returned to the Curia of the Vilnius Archdiocese.

== Gallery ==
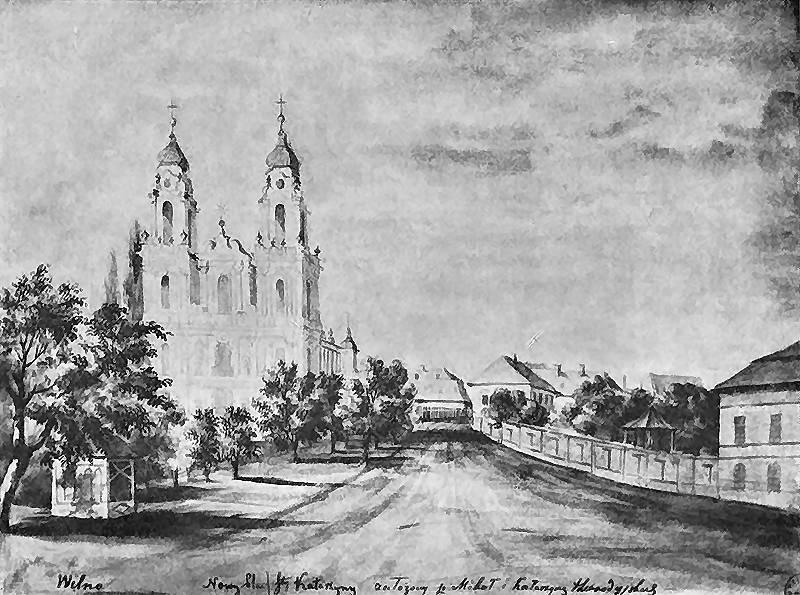
Church of St. Catherine in the 19th century

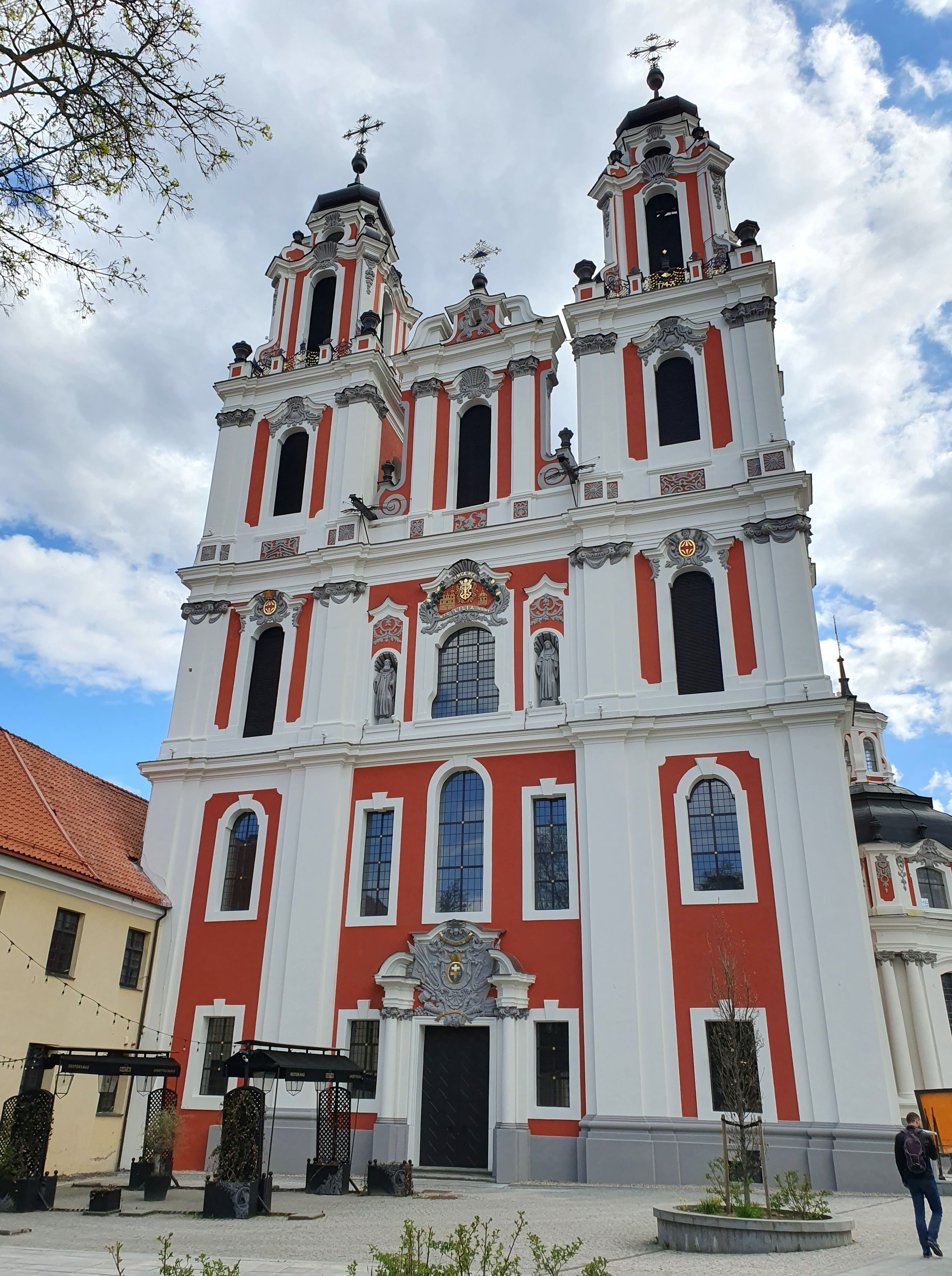
Main façade of the Church of St. Catherine

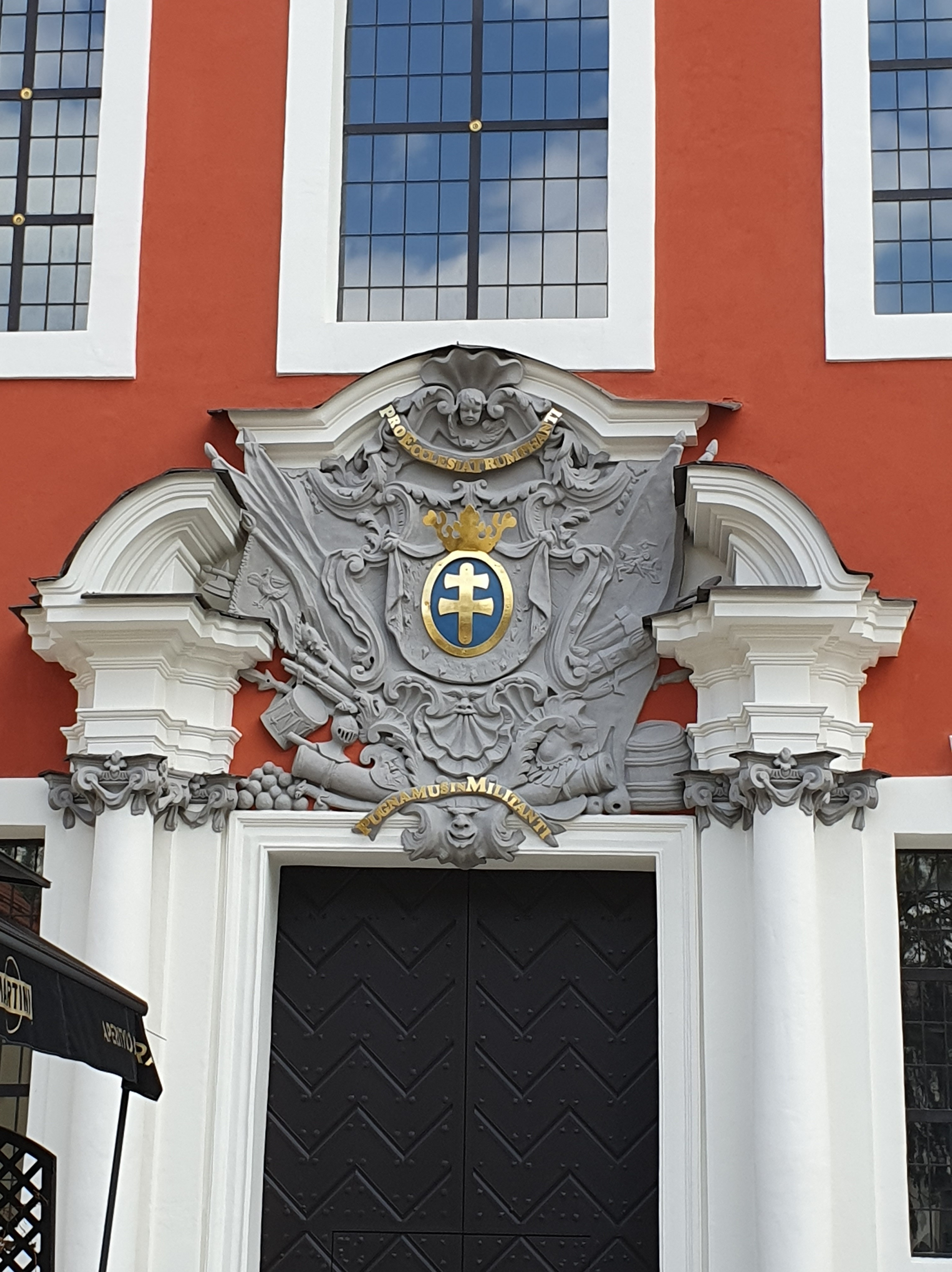
Main portal with the Jagiellonian Cross

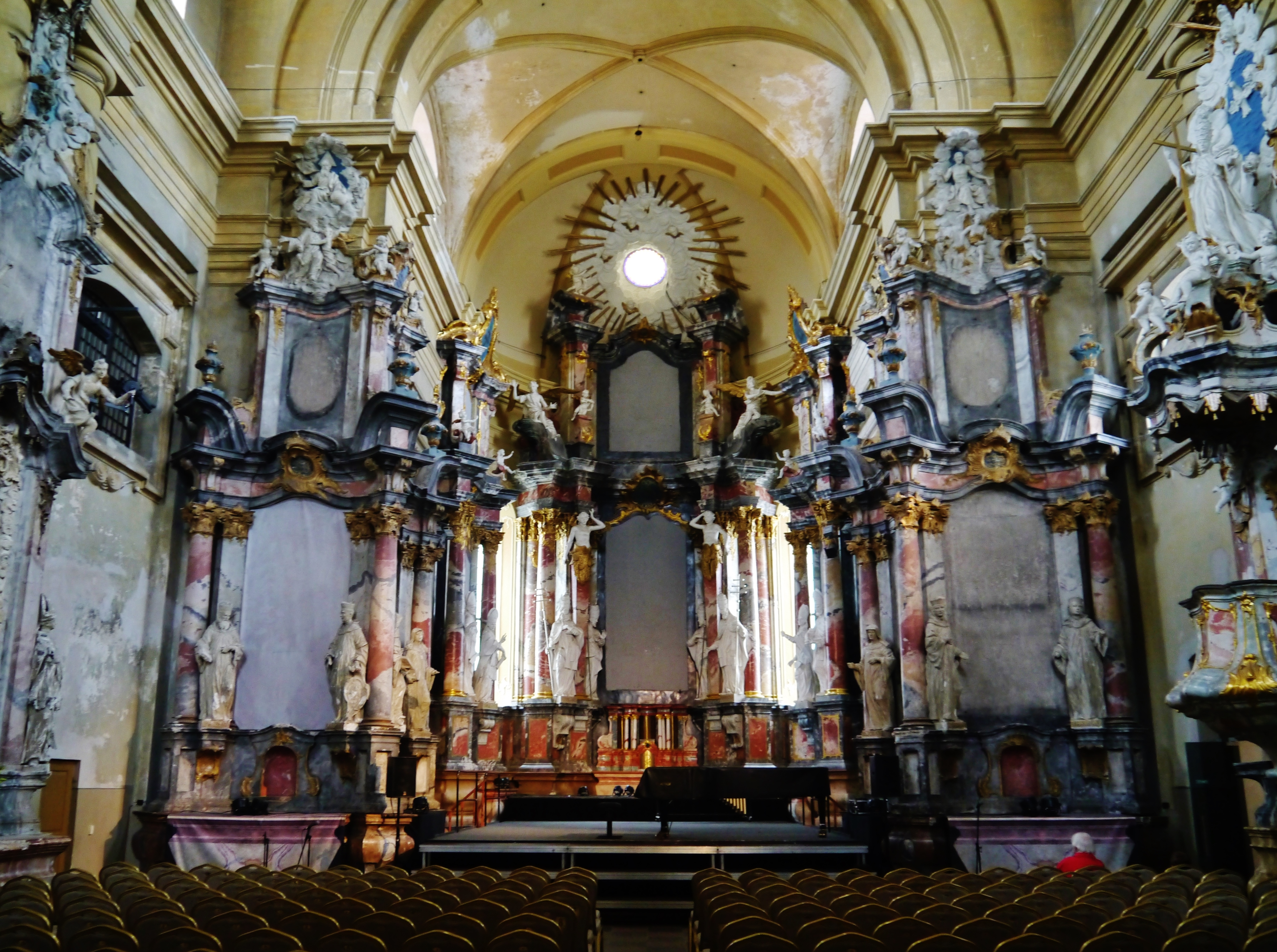
Main altar in 2019

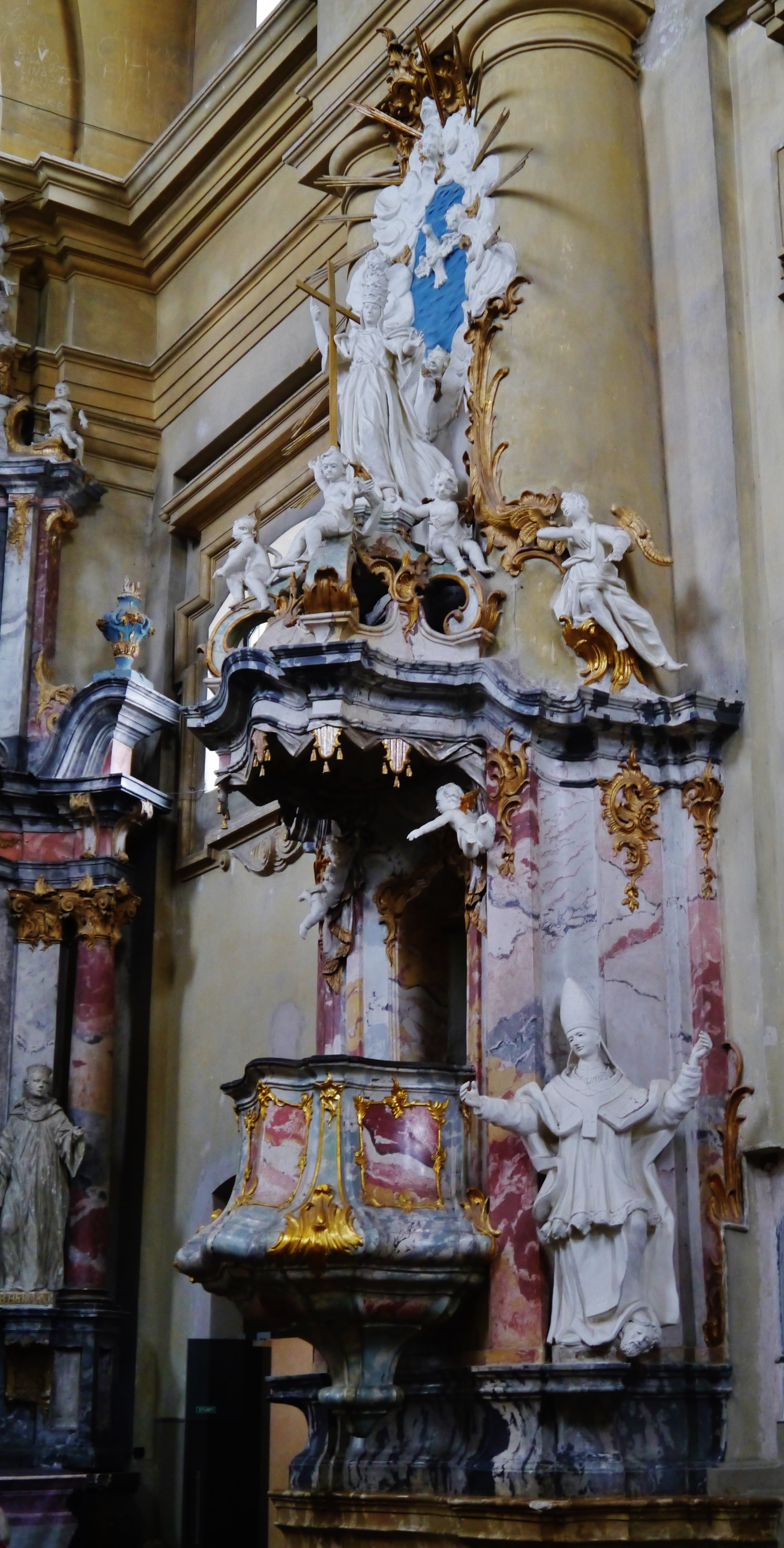
Interior fragment in 2019

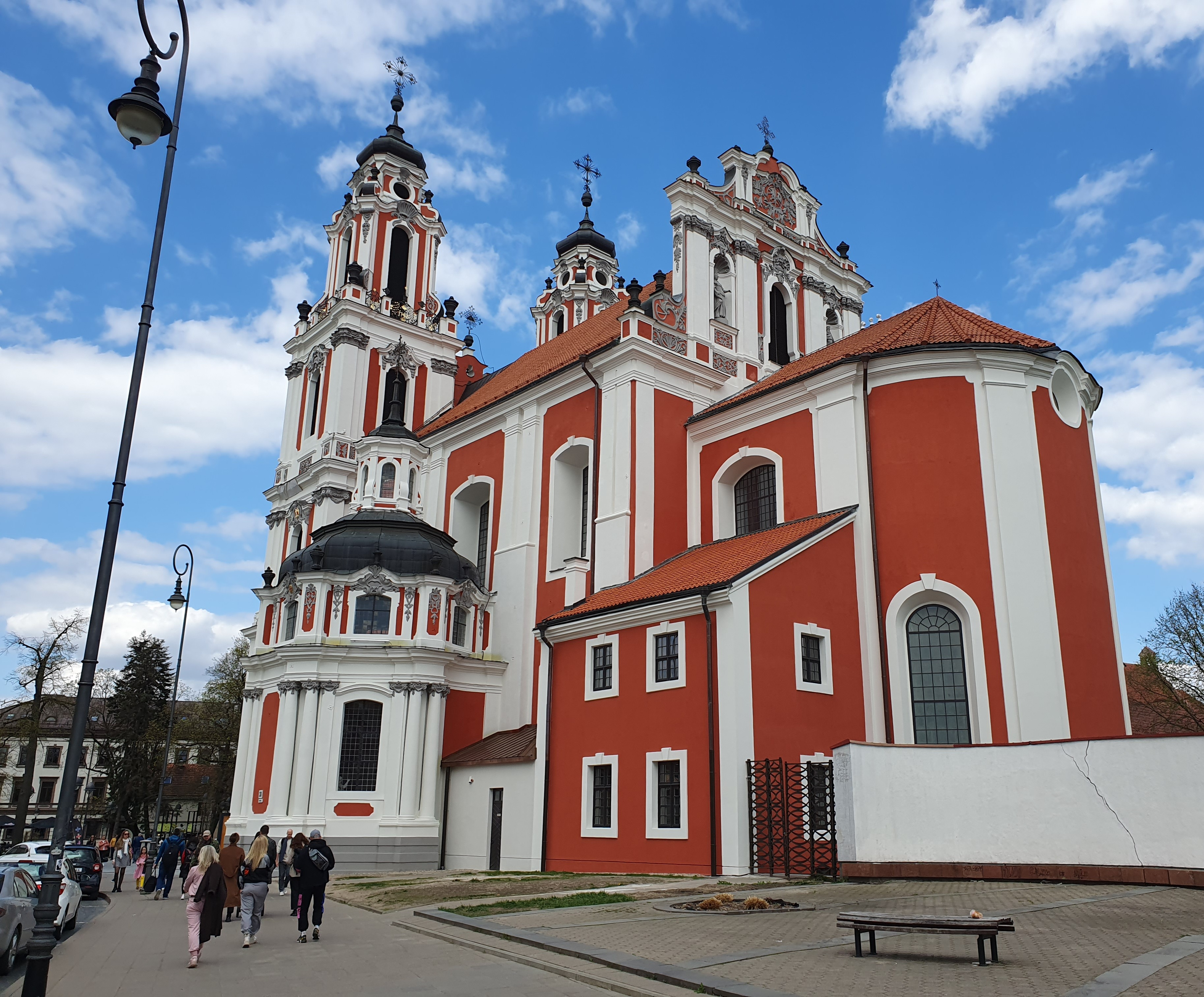
Rear of the church in March 2023

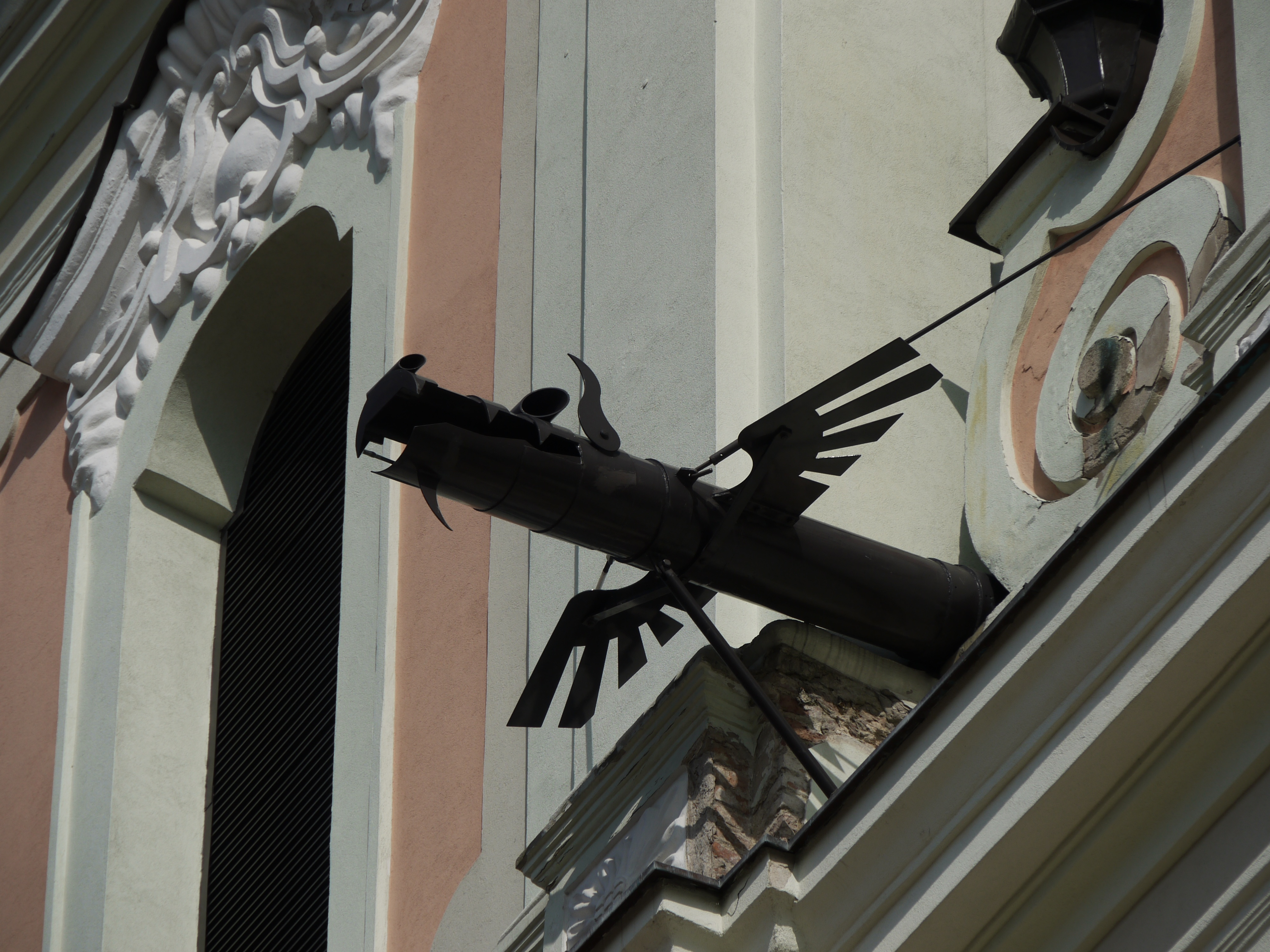
Dragon drain pipe in the main façade of the church
