= S. E. Gontarski =

Stanley E. Gontarski (born February 27, 1942) specializes in twentieth-century Irish Studies, in British, U.S., and European modernism, and in performance theory. He is a leading scholar of the work of Samuel Beckett, having published widely on the subject, and is the Robert O. Lawton Distinguished Professor of English at Florida State University.

== Works ==
=== As editor ===
- Beckett after Beckett (ed. with Anthony Uhlmann), University Press of Florida, 2006.
- The Faber Companion to Samuel Beckett: A Reader's Guide to His Life, Works, and Thought (with C. J. Ackerly), Faber and Faber, 2006.
- The Grove Companion to Samuel Beckett: A Reader's Guide to His Life, Works, and Thought (with C. J. Ackerley), Grove Press, 2004.
- Beckett in Scena: Interpretazioni Memorabili nel Mondo (Drammaturgia 9), a cura di S. E. Gontarski e Annamaria Cascetta (Roma: Salerno Editrice, 2002).
- The Grove Press Reader, 1951-2001, Grove Press, 2001. [Interview with Grove Press author Hubert Selby, Jr., full text.]
- Modernism, Censorship and the Politics of Publishing, Hanes Foundation, Rare Book Collection, University Library, The University of North Carolina at Chapel Hill, 2000.
- The Theatrical Notebooks of Samuel Beckett, Volume IV: The Shorter Plays, Grove Press (U. S.) and Faber and Faber (UK) 1999.
- Samuel Beckett: The Complete Short Prose, 1928-1989, Grove Press, 1995. [The Readers' Subscription featured selection, 1996–7; and New York Times Book Review "New and Noteworthy Paperbacks"].
- The Beckett Studies Reader, University Presses of Florida, 1993.
- The Theatrical Notebooks of Samuel Beckett, Volume II: Endgame, Grove Press (U. S.) and Faber and Faber (UK) 1993. ["Notable Books of the Year: 1993," New York Times Book Review]
- On Beckett: Essays and Criticism, Grove Press, 1986.

=== As author ===
- The Intent of Undoing in Samuel Beckett's Dramatic Texts, Indiana UP, 1985.
- Samuel Beckett: Humanistic Perspectives, Ohio State University Press, 1983. [Finalist for the 1983 Barnard Hewitt Award for outstanding research in theater history.]
- Beckett's "Happy Days": A Manuscript Study, Ohio State University Library Press, 1977.
