= Nohow On =

Book by Samuel Beckett

- Author: Samuel Beckett
- Genre: Prose collection
- Publication date: 1989

Nohow on is a collection of three prose pieces by Samuel Beckett, comprising Company, Ill Seen Ill Said, and Worstward Ho. It was first published in one volume in 1989.
