= Company (novella) =

Short novel by Samuel Beckett

- Cover of the first edition
- Author: Samuel Beckett
- Language: English
- Publisher: Calder Publishing, Les Éditions de Minuit
- Publication date: 1979
- ISBN: 9780394513942

Company is a novella by Samuel Beckett, written in English and published by Calder Publishing in 1979. It was translated into French by the author and published by Les Éditions de Minuit in 1980. Company was Beckett's first work of prose in more than 30 years to be originally written in English.

Together with Ill Seen Ill Said and Worstward Ho, it was collected in the volume Nohow On in 1989. It is one of Beckett's "closed space" stories.

== Plot ==
In the novella a man lies on his back in the dark, musing about the nature of existence and in particular, his own life. While there are several reminiscences about the narrator's own life (and these seem to have an autobiographical air about them), the main concern seems to be that of the paradox of consciousness itself and the nature of reality. If one is conscious about oneself and comments on the self from within the self, then where is the true location of the self? Is the mind that examines the self the true "self" or is the "self" that is the subject of mind the true self. The mind can set itself aside from and examine the body that houses it, the presumed "soul" contained somewhere within it, or indeed any other manifestation of self that the mind cares to focus on. Company seems to ask: "what is the locus of the self and how should a person proceed in relation to that amorphous and dynamic entity?" This relates to Plato's paradox of the third man argument - in which a third self (and then another, and another ad infinitum) is required to explain how a man and the form of man are both man, and so on.

Company illustrates the dilemma of the modern 20th century human, an existential crisis in which "God is dead" and life's purpose seems entirely arbitrary. Beckett's solution in Company is to suggest that a plain acceptance of one's temporality is needed in order to function properly. However, far from being hopeless, such a life is hopeful in that its design is one's own responsibility and not that of some god or fate. Company is a call to action for those who accept the hard facts. "Get on with it," might be a fitting summation.

In terms of the prose, Beckett had a crisis in which he realised he could not mimic James Joyce, whose tendency was—like Rabelais and even the later stream-of-consciousness writers—to add and expound and thus emphatically impose his vision on the reader. Beckett decided instead to subtract, to make his prose simple, monolithic and bare, until the sentences resemble aphorisms or existential nostrums. There is some stylistic resemblance to J. P. Donleavy's work The Saddest Summer of Samuel S (1966) in the short sentences and the general eschewing of punctuation such as commas and question marks. There is also a significant amount of references to the account of Genesis: one critic describes Company as "Beckett's own creation myth".
