= Fizzles =

Short prose pieces by Samuel Beckett

- Cover of Grove's 1977; English paperback version
- Author: Samuel Beckett
- Publisher: Grove Press
- Publication date: 1977
- ISBN: 9780802111937

Fizzles are eight short prose pieces written by Samuel Beckett:

- Fizzle 1 [He is barehead]
- Fizzle 2 [Horn came always]
- Fizzle 3 Afar a Bird
- Fizzle 4 [I gave up before birth]
- Fizzle 5 [Closed place]
- Fizzle 6 [Old earth]
- Fizzle 7 Still
- Fizzle 8 For to end yet again

Some fizzles are unnamed and are identified by their numbers or first few words, which appear above in brackets.

Except for Still, which he wrote in English (1972), Beckett wrote the rest in French (1960) and translated them into English later. Hardback (1976) and paperback (1977) English versions were published by Grove Press. The fizzles are also included in Grove's collection The Complete Short Prose 1929–1989. In 1976, a French version, Pour finir encore et autres foirades, was published by Editions de Minuit and another English version by Calder Publications. Because Beckett felt that the order of presentation was unimportant, each of the three publishers adopted a different one. However, the order chosen by Grove Press, in which they appear above, has become standard.

== Foirades/Fizzles ==
In 1972, Vera Lindsay, who was working as an editor at Petersburg Press, conceived of a collaboration of Beckett with Jasper Johns. In 1973, Johns met Beckett in Paris, where they agreed to work together on a version of Fizzles, with the understanding that Beckett would translate his French texts into English. Because Beckett gave Johns free rein to design the book, he decided to include only five fizzles, but in both languages. In order of appearance, Johns chose fizzles: 2, 5, 1, 6, and 4.

In Paris, Johns made etchings for the book, with the aid of Aldo Crommelynck. They used a variety of intaglio techniques, to create 33 images. In addition, end papers, designed by Johns, were printed as four-color lithographs by William Law at Petersburg Press. Johns took much of the imagery from his painting Untitled 1972, but he also created numerals that introduce the fizzles and a "table of contents", which incorporates stenciled letters from his repertoire. In 1976, Petersburg Press published the resulting artist's book under the title Foirades/Fizzles, in an edition of 250 copies, signed by both creators.

In 1977, shortly after it was published, the book was exhibited, from October 11 to November 20, at the Whitney Museum of American Art. Since then it has appeared in numerous shows, including the landmark Museum of Modern Art exhibit: A Century of Artists’ Books, which ran from October 23, 1994 to January 24, 1995. The exhibit catalog includes an essay, Artists’ Books in the Modern Era 1870–2000, whose authors, Johnson and Stein, referring to Foirades/Fizzles, state:

This cerebral volume that provokes more questions than it answers is considered one of the greatest artist's books of the second half of the twentieth century.

== In popular culture ==
The fizzles have had a significant impact, not only on literature, but also on music and the visual and performing arts. They have been the subject of scholarly works, and academic theses. Fizzles has inspired theatrical performances. So has the artist's book, which has also inspired modern paintings.

In 1993, the English composer and musician Barry Guy released an interpretation titled "Five Fizzles (For S.B.)" on the eponymous CD Fizzles (Maya Recordings), playing chamber bass and double bass. This release was followed by Guy's 2014 live EP Five Fizzles for Samuel Beckett (NoBusiness Records).

On June 15, 2012, Spitalfields Music presented the world premier of Old Earth. Sets for this production were designed by Lucy Wilkinson, it was directed by Jonathan Holmes, and Beckett's words were spoken by Alan Howard. The score was written by Alec Roth and performed by The Sixteen directed by Harry Christophers.
