= Ill Seen Ill Said =

Novella by Samuel Beckett

Ill Seen Ill Said is a novella by Samuel Beckett. It was first published in French as Mal vu mal dit in 1981, and was then translated into English by the author in 1982. It was also published in the October 5, 1981 edition of The New Yorker.

Together with Company and Worstward Ho, it was collected in the volume Nohow On in 1989.
