= Worstward Ho =

Poetic piece by Samuel Beckett

"Worstward Ho" is a work of prose by Samuel Beckett. Its title is a parody of Charles Kingsley's Westward Ho!. Written in English in 1983, it is the penultimate novella by Beckett.

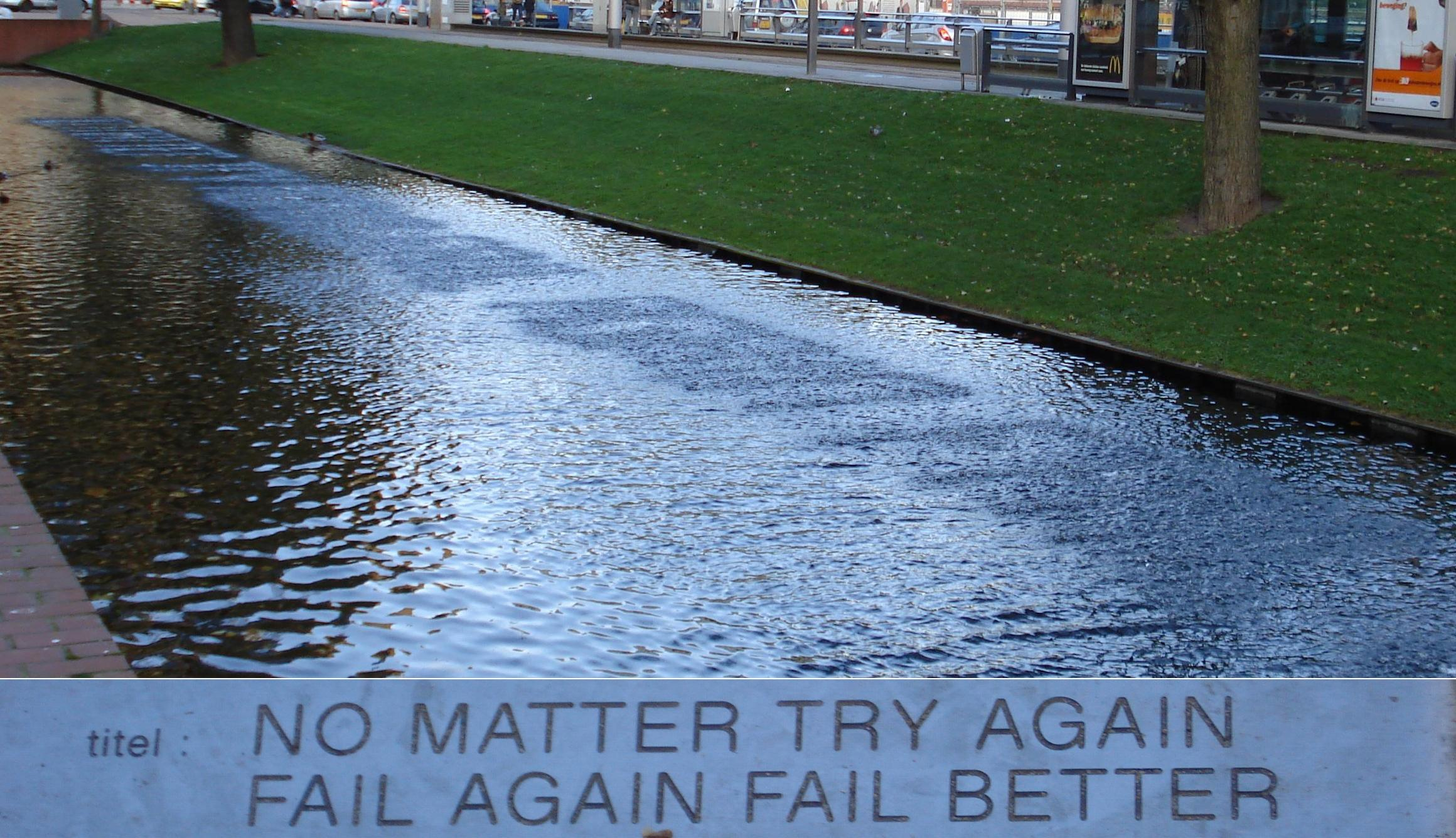
In 2001 a water artwork has been installed by Job Koelewijn in the Westersingel, Rotterdam titled Formule B.

Together with Company and Ill Seen Ill Said, it was collected in the volume Nohow On in 1989. Beckett’s famous quote can be found in Worstward Ho – "Ever tried. Ever failed. No matter. Try again. Fail again. Fail better."

Pianist John Tilbury set the piece to music. Tilbury referred to the "remarkable text" of Worstward Ho as "a deconstruction, no less, of the grammar and syntax of the English language with an extreme economy of words, many of which are monosyllabic."
