= Stirrings Still =

Stirrings Still is the final prose piece by Samuel Beckett, written in English in 1986–89 to give his American publisher, Barney Rosset, something to publish. First published in a signed limited edition, it was later republished in the posthumous edition As The Story Was Told (1990).

The piece was published in its entirety in The Guardian on 3 March 1989. This edition also included a review of the limited edition by Frank Kermode, and a piece on the history of the work's publication by John Calder.

In 2004, members of Binghamton University's English Department founded a scholarly journal called Stirrings Still: The International Journal of Existential Literature, which was named after Beckett's piece.

== Bibliography ==
- Beckett, Samuel. Stirrings Still London: John Calder, 1999.
