= JoAnne Akalaitis =

American theatre director

JoAnne Akalaitis (born June 29, 1937, in Cicero, Illinois) is an avant-garde American theatre director and writer. She has won five Obie Awards for direction (and sustained achievement) and was a co-founder of the New York theater company Mabou Mines.

== Life and career ==
Akalaitis, of Lithuanian descent, was a pre-med student at the University of Chicago, and transferred to Stanford University to study philosophy, before leaving for San Francisco at age 22 without a degree.

After choosing acting as a career, she studied with the Actor's Workshop in San Francisco, the San Francisco Mime Troupe, The Open Theater Workshop in New York, and acting theorist Jerzy Grotowski in France. Additionally, as a Mabou Mines founder, she conducted workshops in Mabou's acting technique.

In addition to the American Repertory Theater – where she has directed Endgame, The Balcony (by Jean Genet) and The Birthday Party (by Harold Pinter) – she has staged works by Euripides, Shakespeare, Strindberg, Schiller, Tennessee Williams, Philip Glass, Janáček, and her own work at the Lincoln Center for the Performing Arts, New York City Opera, Goodman Theatre, Hartford Stage, Mark Taper Forum, Court Theatre, Opera Theatre of Saint Louis, and the Guthrie Theater. She is the former artistic director of the New York Shakespeare Festival and of the Public Theater (1991–1993), and was artist-in-residence at the Court Theatre in Chicago.

Ms. Akalaitis was the Andrew Mellon co-chair of the Directing Program at Juilliard School, and was the Wallace Benjamin Flint and L. May Hawver Flint Professor of Theater at Bard College until 2012. She is the recipient of a Guggenheim Fellowship, National Endowment for the Arts grants, Edwin Booth Award, Rosamund Gilder Award for Outstanding Achievement in Theatre, and Pew Charitable Trusts National Theatre Artist Residency Program grant.

In the early 1980s, Samuel Beckett attempted to shut down a postmodern production of his play Endgame, which she was directing.

Akalaitis is a Fellow of the New York Institute for the Humanities and lives in Manhattan, New York.

== Family ==
She has two children with her ex-husband, composer Philip Glass: Juliet (b. 1968) and Zachary (b. 1971).
