= All Strange Away =

All Strange Away is a short prose text by Samuel Beckett first published in English in 1964. A special signed edition with illustrations by Edward Gorey was published in 1976, and in a trade edition by Grove Press (New York) of collected texts titled, Rockaby and Other Short Pieces in 1981. Beckett's British publisher, John Calder, also printed the work independently in 1979 and again, in 1990, in a collection of late prose works under the title, As the Story was Told.

== Plot ==
In a monologue with himself "in the last person", the nameless unseen protagonist begins with the words, "Imagination dead imagine". He then describes an enclosed space of bare walls that are "five foot square, six high and lit on and off from no visible source. Evoking a theatrical setting, he imagines light fading up on a stool surrounded by walls displaying women's faces while, in a corner, he perceives the "tattered syntaxes of Jolly and Draeger Praeger Draeger". The size and description of the space with "no way in, none out" is subject to change depending on the clarity of the protagonist's failing memory as he attempts to recall a love affair with Emma.

== Sources ==
=== Primary ===
- Beckett, Samuel (1990). "All Strange Away" in As the Story was Told. London: Calder Publishers ISBN 0-7145-4113-3

=== Secondary ===
- Ackerley, C.J. and Gontarski, A.E. (2004). The Grove Companion to Samuel Beckett. New York: Grove Press ISBN 0-8021-4049-1
