= First Love (short story) =

"First Love" is a short story by Samuel Beckett, written in 1946 and first published in its original French version ("Premier Amour") in 1970 and in Beckett's English translation in 1973.

The narrator tells of his discovery on a park bench (where he loitered after becoming homeless upon the death of his father) by a prostitute who takes him in, and of their strange "union," leading to the birth of a child and the narrator's abandonment of both.

It was adapted for the stage in 1996 receiving its world premiere at the Cottesloe Theatre (National Theatre) directed by Valerie Doulton and performed by Kilian McKenna.

In 2001, Romanian stage director Radu Afrim developed a version for the stage in Bucharest. Ralph Fiennes also performed an adaptation live at the Sydney Festival in 2007.
