= Ping (short story) =

"Ping" is a short story written by Samuel Beckett in French (originally "Bing") in 1966. Beckett later translated it into English and published it in 1967. The French version was set to music by the composer Jean-Yves Bosseur with Beckett's help in 1981 and redone in 2001. David Lodge has described "Ping" as: "the rendering of the consciousness of a person confined in a small, bare, white room, a person who is evidently under extreme duress, and probably at the last gasp of life."

"Ping" is a very compact short story punctuated only by periods. The story is barely two pages but is usually presented in a justified alignment to heighten the feeling of claustrophobia. As noted by Dan O'Hara,

"The density of Ping's prose style is its most immediate and most intriguing aspect; it seems condensed or undiluted. Like César's compressed sculptures of crushed cars, all the constituent elements are squashed into an uncomfortable proximity [...] In Ping, all the spaces between, the gaps, have been forced out; no air flows around the words. Read aloud, Ping enacts this asphyxia."

== Interpretations ==
The interpretation of "Ping" has been heavily debated since its publication. Interpretations have ranged from Jesus Christ in the tomb to a person in a hospital bed post-surgery to "the first act of creation". The story is basic and repetitive, allowing a range of possibilities, but the standard interpretation is that "Ping" covers the last moments of a person's life.

Additional discussion focused on the interpretation of the onomatopoeia ping scattered throughout the story. The pings could mark the character's shifting mindset from optimism to despair. O'Hara speculated that the use of ping, a specifically metallic onomatopoeia, may refer to Beckett's medical history. Beckett was hospitalized in 1964 and 1965. He was then diagnosed with double cataracts in 1966 and a number of people in his life either died or became ill. O'Hara hypothesized that the pings were the sounds of an electrocardiograph machine.
