= Walter D. Asmus =

German theatre director (born 1941)

Walter D. Asmus (born 1941 in Lübeck) is a German theatre director.

== Career ==
Asmus studied German and English Literature, Philosophy and Theatre Sciences in Hamburg, Vienna and Freiburg and spent a year in London in the late sixties where he lived in the vibrant Camden Town with the North Villas set. Experience as an actor and director at University drama groups. First publications (Theater heute, Shakespeare yearbook) After two years as co-director of Theatre in der Tonne (Reutlingen), he worked at the Schiller Theatre in Berlin as assistant director/dramaturgical collaborator and director. There he met Samuel Beckett in 1974 and was assistant for the author's renowned production of "Waiting for Godot", 1975.

Asmus worked with Samuel Beckett (theatre and television) until the authors death in 1989 (That Time/ Footfalls/ Play/Come and Go/ Waiting for Godot/ ...but the clouds.../ Ghost Trio/ Eh Joe/ What Where).

Since 1976 he was freelance director at the Schiller Theater, Staatstheater Darmstadt, Staatstheater Kassel, Thalia Theater, Theater Freiburg and internationally. 1983-1986 he was director at Badisches Staatstheater Karlsruhe. He was Professor in the acting department at the Hochschule für Musik, Theater und Medien Hannoverufrom 1986ntil he became emeritus in 2006. He was Head of the department since 1994.

Asmus directed all of Samuel Beckett's plays internationally.

His 1991 Gate Theatre (Dublin) production of Waiting for Godot was revived several times with the same cast until 2008 and had en suite runs at the Gate Theatre. It went on tour to Chicago, Sevilla, Toronto, Melbourne, London, New York (Lincoln Center Festival), Beijing and Shanghai. US-tours in 1998 and 2006. It finished after an all-Ireland tour (32 counties, one night only) on October 3, 2008. This production of Waiting for Godot (starring Barry McGovern, Johnny Murphy, Alan Stanford and Stephen Brennan) was regarded by reviewers and academics alike as "definitive". In 2000 Asmus was co-director of the international Beckett-Festival "Beckett in Berlin 2000", Berlin.

== Selected theatre productions ==
- 1977 Happy Days, Bristol Music Centre Teatret, Copenhagen
- 1978 Waiting for Godot, Brooklyn Academy of Music, New York - Endgame, Bristol Music Centre Teatret, Copenhagen
- 1979 Rough for Theatre I/II, (world premiers), Thalia Theatre Hamburg - That Time, Not I, Footfalls, State Theatre Darmstadt
- 1981 Endgame, Stary Teatret, Cracow
- 1982 Krapp's Last Tape, Not I, Ohio Impromptu, Rockaby, Betty Nansen Teatret, Copenhagen
- 1983 Waiting for Godot, State Theatre Karlsruhe
- 1984 Waiting for Godot, San Quentin Drama Workshop, Goodman Theatre, Chicago/ Riverside Studios, London, in collaboration with the author
- 1988 Waiting for Godot, Gate Theatre, Dublin - Endgame, Theater Freiburg
- 1990 Waiting for Godot, Betty Nansen Teatret, Copenhagen
- 1991 Waiting for Godot, Gate Theatre, Dublin Breath, That Time, A Piece of Monologue Betty Nansen Teatret, Copenhagen
- 2003 Waiting for Godot, 7Stages, Atlanta
- 2004 Waiting for Godot, Footfalls, A Piece of Monologue, Rubicon Theatre, Ventura
- 2005 Endgame, Dramatic Arts Centre, Shanghai. First production ever in Mandarin in China
- 2006 Revival of Endgame in Shanghai - Stage adaptation of Beckett's Novella First Love for the Sydney Writers´ Festival (performed at Sydney Theatre Company)
- 2014 "Not I", "Footfalls", "Rockaby" with Lisa Dwan. Royal Court Theatre, London. West End transfer (Duchess Theatre).
- 2016 "Not I", "Eh Joe", Østre Gasværk Teater, Copenhagen, with Morten Grunwald
- 2017 "Not I", "Footfalls", "Eh Joe", Volksbühne Berlin, with Anne Tismer and Morten Grunwald
- 2024 "Happy Days“, English Theatre Berlin (ETB), with Mary Kelly and Tomas Spencer.

== Television ==
- 1976 Samuel Beckett's Berlin production of Waiting for Godot at the Schiller-Theater for German television ZDF
- 1988 Rockaby, Footfalls and Eh Joe, with Billie Whitelaw for German television station SDR, Stuttgart
- 1988 The San Quentin Drama Workshop production of Waiting for Godot from 1984 and Beckett's production (1978) of Krapp's Last Tape with Rick Cluchey. Both plays in French (with Roman Polanski and Roland Bertin among others) for French TV stations La Sept and France 3 and US station PBS, Paris.

== Film ==
- 2000 Footfalls for the Beckett on Film Project, Dublin. The Waiting for Godot film for the same project was based on his 1991 production of the play at the Gate Theatre.
- 2013 "What Where" produced by UWS (University of Western Sydney) in Sydney

== Radio ==
- 1995 Company for German station SWR Baden-Baden.

== Publications ==
Numerous publications and interviews about the collaboration with Samuel Beckett in periodicals e.g. Theater Heute, Theater Quarterly and The Journal of Beckett Studies.

== Awards ==
- 2004 Nomination for the Los Angeles Stage Alliance Ovation Award for best direction of a play (Waiting for Godot at Rubicon Theatre, Ventura, CA)
- 2009/ 2010 AIR AWARD (The Annenberg Foundation) and Artist-in-Residence at the Metabolic Studio Pipeline Project (Annenberg Foundation), Los Angeles
- 2025 Ambassador of Ireland Award.
