= Mercier and Camier =

Novel by Samuel Beckett

- First edition (French)
- Author: Samuel Beckett
- Original title: Mercier et Camier
- Translator: Samuel Beckett
- Language: French
- Publisher: Les Éditions de Minuit (French); Calder and Boyars (UK) (English); Grove Press (US) (English)
- Publication date: 1970
- Publication place: France
- English publication date: 1974

Mercier and Camier is a novel by Samuel Beckett that was written in 1946, but remained unpublished until 1970. Appearing immediately before his celebrated "trilogy" of Molloy, Malone Dies and The Unnamable, Mercier et Camier was Beckett's first attempt at extended prose fiction in French. Beckett refused to publish it in its original French until 1970, and while an English translation by Beckett himself was published in 1974 (London: Calder and Boyars and New York: Grove Press), the author had made substantial alterations to and deletions from the original text while "reshaping" it from French to English.

The novel features the "pseudocouple" Mercier and his friend, the private investigator Camier, in their repeated attempts to leave a city, a thinly disguised version of Dublin, only to abandon their journey and return. Frequent visits are paid to "Helen's Place," a tawdry house modeled on that of legendary Dublin madam Becky Cooper (much like Becky Cooper, Helen has a talking parrot). A much-changed Watt makes a cameo appearance, bringing his stick down on a pub table and yelling "Fuck life!"

The story may reference the kidnap and murder of Noel Lemass in 1923 by Free State secret police from Oriel House. Lemass was kidnapped after lunching with his former boss and discussing returning to his job now that the Civil War was over. His boss saw him taken into Oriel House. Lemass disappeared; his decayed body was finally found in the Featherbeds in the Dublin Mountains.
