= Footfalls =

Literary work

Paperback Faber, 1976 First Edition

Footfalls is a play by Samuel Beckett. It was written in English, between 2 March and December 1975 and was first performed at the Royal Court Theatre as part of the Samuel Beckett Festival, on May 20, 1976 directed by Beckett himself. Billie Whitelaw, for whom the piece had been written, played May whilst Rose Hill voiced the mother.

== Synopsis ==
The play is in four parts. Each opens with the sound of a bell. After this the lights fade up to reveal an illuminated strip along which a woman, May, paces back and forth, nine steps within a one-metre stretch. In each part, the light will be somewhat darker than in the preceding one. Therefore, it is darkest when the strip is lit up without May at the very end. Correspondingly, the bell gets slightly softer each time. Beckett introduced a "Dim spot on face during halts at R [right] and L [left]" so that May's face would be visible during her monologues.

The play has a very musical structure and timing is critical. "The walking should be like a metronome", Beckett instructed, "one length must be measured in exactly nine seconds." "These 'life-long stretches of walking,' he told his German May, Hildegard Schmahl, are 'the centre of the play; everything else is secondary'."

To ensure that every step could be heard "sandpaper was attached to the soles of [Billie] Whitelaw's soft ballet slippers" during the London premiere.

As she covers the nine paces (seven in earlier printed texts) she hugs herself, the arms crossed, with the hands clasping the shoulders in front. 'When you walk, you slump together, when you speak, you straighten up a bit.' Schmahl asked Beckett if May's posture was supposed to express fear? "No, not fear. It expresses that May is there exclusively for herself. She is isolated."

One of a long line of Beckett protagonists whose name begins with an M, May is a woman in her forties (who should however appear "ageless" according to Beckett). She paces back and forth on a strip of bare landing outside her dying – if not already dead – mother's room (a vertical ray of light not in the printed text suggests a door barely ajar).

The woman, clearly a shadow of her former self, wears tattered nightwear and has a ghostly pallor. Beckett said: "One could go very far towards making the costume quite unrealistic, unreal. It could, however, also be an old dressing-gown, worked like a cobweb … It is the costume of a ghost." "You feel cold. The whole time, in the way you hold your body too. Everything is frost and night." The adjective 'ghostly' is used frequently – by Beckett himself and others – to describe various aspects of Footfalls.

The play – significantly – only has a semblance of a plot.

May's mother is only ever heard. We learn that she is apparently ninety years old and in poor health. The more likely truth is that she is a creation of May's mind, especially when one examines Beckett's earlier drafts.

=== Part I ===
As she paces, May and her mother carry on a conversation. They go through the daily routine by rote. Both voices are low and slow throughout. May asks her mother if she requires tending in any way. To each request the mother says: "Yes, but it is too soon." The full list of comforts offered to the suffering mother carry a biblical resonance: dressings, sponge, lip-moistening and prayer. The suffering daughter, on the other hand, paces on the bare floorboards nailed as in a cross; in the church later 'she' paces across the arms of the cross.

May asks her mother what age she is. She's told that she is in her "forties" but only after May has first let her mother know that she is ninety.

The mother asks May: "Will you never have done … revolving it all … In your poor mind?" The pacing back and forth is an externalisation of this inner unresolved issue. "It All" was a title Beckett was considering before he opted for Footfalls though we never discover what "it" might be. May may or may not be a ghost but she is undoubtedly a haunted individual; the umbilical cord has clearly never been severed.

"M (May) and V (Voice) create a dialogue which is simultaneously time present and time past, for, although the mother's voice is an echo from the past, May is speaking to her in the endless present dramatized before our eyes. Quite literally in Footfalls, the past is in the present." Simply put: they are 'living' in the past.

=== Part II ===
In the second part, the mother's voice addresses the audience directly. She tells us that she too is watching her daughter along with us literally through the corridor wall. We learn that the turning point in May's life, the "it" happened in girlhood: "when other girls her age were out at … lacrosse" she had already begun her obsessive pacing. From that time on significantly she has not ventured outside.

In the beginning the hall had been carpeted but May had asked her mother to have it taken up. When questioned the child had said because she needed to "hear the feet, however faint they fall"; "the "motion alone is not enough". The apparition in the story in Part III on the other hand makes "No sound. [Pause] None at least to be heard."

In an earlier draft the voice tells the audience: "My voice is in her mind" suggestive of the fact that the mother actually is only a figment of May's imaginings. This is borne out by the fact that voice tells the story of a girl who "called her mother"," instead of simply talking about a girl who "called me." This is the kind of slip May might make if she was narrating the mother's part herself.

We also learn how May sleeps, "in snatches" with her head bowed against the wall which is reminiscent of Mary in Watt (novel).

"Beckett explains [why] the mother interrupts herself in the sentence 'In the old home, the same where she—(pause)' and then continues 'The same where she began. She was going to say: ... the same where she was born. But that is wrong, she hasn't been born. She just began. It began. There is a difference. She was never born.' There is the connection with the Jung story [detailed below]. A life, which didn't begin as a life, but which was just there, as a thing".

=== Part III ===
In Part II the mother speaks of the daughter, in the third part, the daughter of the mother, in a way that is exactly parallel. 'One must sense the similarities of both narratives,' explained Beckett, 'Not so much from the text as from the style, from the way that the text is spoken.'

In a manner similar to Mouth in Not I, "the shift into third person narrative and the indefinite pronoun work both to objectify the text, making it into a separate entity that seems disconnected from personal history. In that sense the recitation becomes a verbal structure repeated in consciousness rather than a sequence of memories in spontaneous association." This part can be subdivided into four sections.

After each section May halts for a time and then resumes pacing.

==== Sequel ====
This part opens with May uttering the word, "Sequel" twice, which Beckett asked to be pronounced as "Seek well" – another pun – since she is seeking for herself.

May begins to tell a story in which an undefined 'she', probably herself, has taken to haunting the local Anglican church, which she enters through a locked door; there 'she' walks 'up and down, up and down, his poor arm'" "Literally she is walking along the 'arms' of a cross-shaped church."

==== The Semblance ====
The description of the spectre is similar to how the audience sees May: "a tangle of tatters" and her pacing is comparable except that the ghost paces along the crossbeam whereas May paces the length of the stage.

A residual haunting is where the entity does not seem to be cognizant of any living beings and performs the same repetitive act. It often is the reenactment of a tragic event, although it may sometimes be a very mundane act that was repeated often in life. It is generally not considered an actual ghost but some form of energy that remains in a particular location. The ghost goes about their business oblivious to the world of the living – what Beckett meant by the expression "being for herself," Night by night ghosts pace their prescribed path offering no explanation to the viewers as to why they re-enact the same scene over and over. The answers – or at least best guesses – have to come from research done by the living in the real world.

The apparition is "by no means invisible" and can be seen "in a certain light." It brings to mind the quote Beckett prefaced Film with: "Esse est percipi": a Latin dictum meaning "to be is to be perceived."

Additionally, a ghost does not have to be dead; the word can be defined as: "a mere shadow or semblance; a trace: He's a ghost of his former self."

==== Amy and Mrs Winter ====
May makes up a story about a woman, Amy (an anagram of May) and her mother, a Mrs Winter. Although he knew a Mrs Winter in real life the name would have been chosen to reflect the coldness of "his own 'winter's tale', just as he changed the 'south door' of the church in the manuscript to the 'north door' at a late stage for the same reason."

The name Amy is another pun: "A me."

Mrs Winter has become aware of something strange "at Evensong" and questions her daughter about it while at supper. She asks if Amy had seen anything strange during the service but the daughter insists she did not because she "was not there" a point her mother takes issue with because she is convinced that she heard her distinctly say "Amen." This is not a dramatisation of the event that traumatised May however as that happened in girlhood and Amy is described in the text as "scarcely a girl any more."

"'The daughter only knows the voice of the mother'. One can recognize the similarity between the two from the sentences in their narratives, from the expression. The strange voice of the daughter comes from the mother. The 'Not enough?' in the mother's story must sound just like the 'Not there?' of Mrs W in Amy's story, for example. These parallelisms are extremely important for the understanding of the play … One can suppose that she has written down everything which she has invented up to this, that she will one day find a reader for her story—therefore the address to the reader …'Words are as food for this poor girl.' Beckett says. 'They are her best friends.' … Above all, it is important that the narrative shouldn't be too flowing and matter-of-course. It shouldn't give the impression of something already written down. May is inventing her story while she is speaking. She is creating and seeing it all gradually before her. It is an invention from beginning to end. The picture emerges gradually with hesitation, uncertainty – details are always being added."

==== May becomes 'Amy' ====
Just as the light from Part I to Part III becomes constantly darker, the tone quieter, so the walking gets slower. When she begins to walk, there's a small hesitation, as though she were unsure if she should walk or not. "Beckett pointed out that on her last walk along the strip of light, her energy runs out after three paces and she has to wait there until enough vitality returns to drag herself to the end of the light."

"As the play ends, Mrs Winter speaks to Amy the very words spoken to May by her mother: 'Will you never have done … revolving it all?'" Up until this point May has identified who has been speaking, At the end, when 'Mrs W' says, "Amy" it is May who answers, "Yes, Mother" – significantly she does not say, "Amy: Yes, Mother."

Can May be the ghost and be 'Amy'? Yes, if each reflects a different aspect of who she is.

=== Part IV ===
In the final section there is no one on stage. The bell chimes, the lights come up and then fade out.

"The final ten seconds with 'No trace of May', is a crucial reminder that May was always 'not there' or only there as a 'trace'." "May, like the Amy of her story, is simply 'not there.' 'Strange or otherwise,' we hear nothing, we see nothing. Absence is the only presence." As Beckett told Billie Whitelaw, when she asked him if May was dead, he replied, "Let's just say you're not all there." This has been interpreted by many to mean that May is not dead. But it should be remembered that [a] ghost has a curious relation to finitude, which means it is never entirely unearthly or out of this world. [G]hosts, ... are traditionally tied to places, condemned for a certain time to walk the earth.

In an interview with Jonathan Kalb, Billie Whitelaw describes May's journey: "In Footfalls … [May] gets lower and lower and lower until it's like a little pile of ashes on the floor at the end, and the light comes up and she's gone."

James Knowlson and John Pilling in Frescoes of the Skull (p 227) come close to summarising the entire play in a single sentence: "We realise, perhaps only after the play has ended, that we may have been watching a ghost telling a tale of a ghost (herself), who fails to be observed by someone else (her fictional alter ego) because she in turn is not really there … even the mother's voice may simply be a voice in the mind of a ghost."

== Background ==
Beckett's mother, also called May, had "difficulty sleeping through the night, and there were often times when she paced the floor of her room or wandered through the darkened house as silently as one of the ghosts which she swore haunted it… She [also] removed the carpets in some areas" so she could hear her feet no matter how faint they fell.

Hildegard Schmahl wanted to know how was the figure of May to be understood. "In the thirties", he said, "C.G. Jung, the psychologist, once gave a lecture in London and told of a female patient who was being treated by him. Jung said he wasn't able to help this patient and for this", according to Beckett, "he gave an astonishing explanation. This girl wasn't living. She existed but didn't actually live."

Jung does not appear to have explained what he meant by 'never been properly born', but he must have meant either that the trauma of birth had somehow been bypassed, leaving a gap in the emotional history of the patient or that the person concerned did not really exist in terms of having a full consciousness.

Beckett recognized in this psychological dilemma an example of "his own womb fixation, arguing forcefully that all his behavior, from the simple inclination to stay in bed to his deep-seated need to pay frequent visits to his mother, were all aspects of an improper birth."

"The implication in Footfalls is that May has remained in the Imaginary, ... womb" and that that womb is also her tomb is a recurring theme with Beckett.

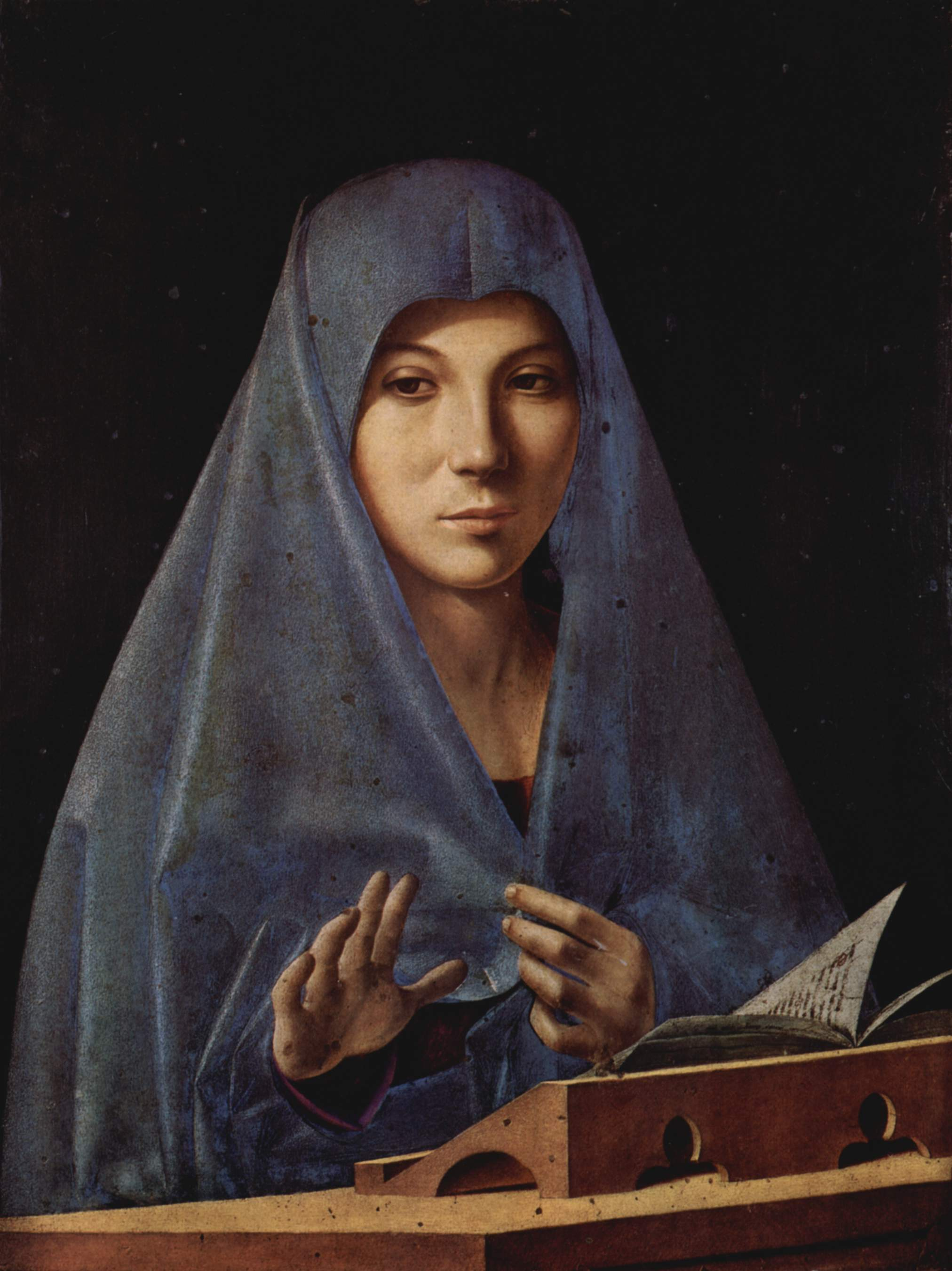
Antonello's Virgin Annunciate

Among the myths underlying psychic life, Jung favoured that of the hero who has to stand up to a devouring Great Mother figure threatening to drag him back into symbiotic unconsciousness. His entry into her womb/tomb and successful re-emergence constitutes his own renewal and transformation.

"Only two years before writing Footfalls, [Beckett] had also met the daughter of an old friend, who described to him graphically her own depression, distress and extreme agoraphobia, telling him how, unable to face the world, she used to pace relentlessly up and down in her apartment." It is not unreasonable to assume there may be an association between the character of May and this girl.

If we viewed May's pacing from above "we would see the tracing on the stage floor of a tremendously elongated variation of the figures 8 turned on its side … the mathematical symbol for infinity."

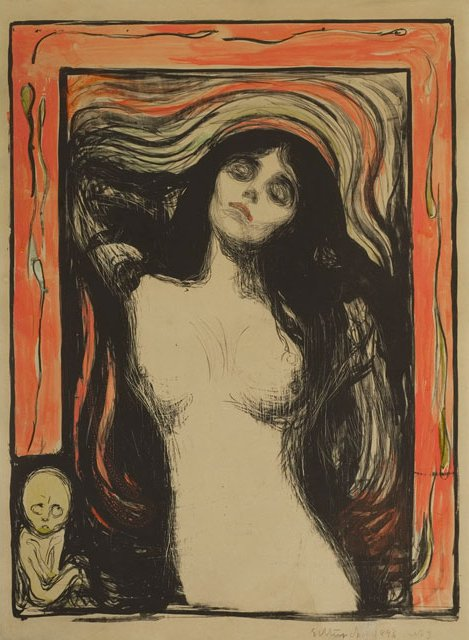
Munch's "Madonna"

Beckett was also indebted to the French psychologist Pierre Janet for his conception of hysterical behaviour. In his overview of Janet's work, Robert Woodworth in his Contemporary Schools of Psychology, a work Beckett read, pays particular attention to Janet's description of the "hysterical paralysis of one arm", which Beckett incorporated, into May's posture. There are a number of analogies between Footfalls and Janet's work with a patient called Irène: He lists "the deep sleep, the sleep-walking, the hearing of the mother's voice … the terrifying extreme of Irène's fabulation, the drama of daily re-enactment, of pathological memory possessing the body and mind of the traumatised hysteric, … returning again and again each night light a nightmare in a private theatre."

Much time was spent in pre-production getting May's posture exactly right. Whitelaw said she felt "like a moving, musical, Edvard Munch painting". In reality her pose creates "a striking parallel with the picture of The Virgin of the Annunciation by Antonello da Messina", which Beckett had seen forty years earlier in Munich's Alte Pinakothek.

Beckett too was very familiar with the work of Munch and May's pose is also reminiscent of Munch's Madonna. Munch described the work in this way: "Now life and death join hands. The chain is joined that ties the thousands of past generations to the thousands of generations to come" "He painted a woman in warm hues," Anna K. Norris observes, "her torso bare and her head tilted back, with long reddish hair flowing around her body. Her eyes are closed, her lips slightly parted in silent rapture. Her face is pale and bony, and crowned with a deep orange halo. […] the work was originally presented with a painted frame of circling sperm. The lithograph versions have the sperm border, and a fetus with its arms crossed in the corpse position looking up unhappily at the Madonna from the lower left corner. Munch is playing with opposites here: fertility and virginity, lust and chastity, and in his words, life and death."

== Related works ==
"Maddy Rooney remembers 'one of those new mind doctors' lecturing on a little girl patient: 'The trouble with her was she had never been really born!' (All That Fall, Faber and Faber, 36–37); and Malone feels he is 'far already from the world that parts at last its labia and lets me go.' 'Yes,' he affirms, 'an old foetus, that's what I am now, hoar and impotent, mother is done for, I've rotted her, she'll drop me with the help of gangrene, perhaps papa is at the party too, I'll land head-foremost mewling in the charnel-house, not that I'll mewl, not worth it.' 'The feet are clear already, of the great cunt of existence' (Trilogy, Calder Publications 190, 226, 285). The phrase 'never been properly born' is buried in the 'Addenda' of Watt (Calder and Boyars, 248); and the idea is surely present in the climactic image of Godot: 'Astride of a grave and a difficult birth' (Waiting for Godot, Faber and Faber, 90)." Footfalls [also] anticipates the key ritual that five years later will possess the old woman of Ill Seen Ill Said: the "long pacing to and fro in the gloom" (Ill Seen Ill Said, Faber and Faber, p 47).
