= Nacht und Träume (play) =

Nacht und Träume (Night and Dreams) is the last television play written and directed by Samuel Beckett. It was written in English (mid-1982) for the German channel Süddeutscher Rundfunk, recorded in October 1982 and broadcast on 19 May 1983 where it attracted "an audience of two million viewers." The mime artist Helfrid Foron played both parts.

It was published by Faber in Collected Shorter Plays in 1984. Originally entitled Nachtstück (Night Piece), it is a wordless play, the only sound that of a male voice humming, then singing, from the last seven bars of Schubert’s lied Nacht und Träume, words by Matthäus Casimir von Collin: "Holde Träume, kehret wieder!" ("Sweet dreams, come back"). Schubert was a composer much loved by Beckett – "the composer who spoke most to him … whom he considered a friend in suffering" – and this lied was one of the author’s favourites.

James Knowlson, in his biography of Beckett, states that the actual text used however was a slightly modified version by Heinrich Joseph von Collin, Matthäus’s brother.

== Synopsis ==
Beckett lists five elements that make up the play: evening light, the dreamer (A), his dreamt self (B), a pair of dreamt hands and the last seven bars of Schubert’s lied. It reads more like a formula or a list of ingredients than a cast.

The action begins with a dreamer sitting alone in a dark empty room; his hands are resting on the table before him. He is on the far left of the screen and we are presented with his right profile. A male voice hums the last seven bars of the Schubert lied. Then we hear the same section sung, the man rests his head on his hands and the light fades until the words "Holde Träume" whereupon it fades up on the man’s dreamt self who is seated on an invisible podium four feet higher and well to the right of him. We see his left profile, a mirror image of his waking self. His is bathed in what Beckett describes as a "kinder light." The dreamer is still faintly visible throughout though.

A left hand appears out of the darkness and gently rests on B. As the man raises his head it withdraws. The right appears with a cup from which B drinks. It vanishes and then reappears to gently wipe his brow with a cloth. Then it disappears again. B raises his head to gaze upon the invisible face and holds out his right hand, palm upward. The right hand returns and rests on B’s right hand. He looks at the two hands together and adds his left hand. Together the three hands sink to the table and B rests his head on them. Finally the left hand comes out of the darkness and rests gently on his head.

The dream fades as A awakens but when the music is replayed the sequence is replayed, in close-up and slower.

Afterwards the camera withdraws leaving us with an image of a "recovering" A before the light fades away completely.

== Interpretation ==
Albrecht Dürer, Study of Praying Hands, 1508

The play finds its origin in Beckett’s fascination with Albrecht Dürer's famous etching of praying hands, a reproduction of which had hung in his room at Cooldrinagh as a child, however "the dark, empty room with its rectangle of light and its black-coated figure hunched over the table, resembled a schematised seventeenth century Dutch painting even more explicitly than Ohio Impromptu.".

Beckett insisted to Dr Müller-Freinfels that "the sex of the hands must remain uncertain. One of our numerous teasers". He did, however concede to James Knowlson that these "sexless hands … might perhaps be a boy’s hands". In the end, practicality demanded that he opt for female hands with the proviso, "Large but female. As more conceivably male than male conceivably female."

"Beckett never endorses a belief in salvation from, or redemption for, suffering. But the need for some temporary comfort from suffering becomes acute in his late work, especially in the work for television." The helping hand is an image of consolation. It suggests a kind of benediction. In ritualistic and sacramental fashion the blessed shade offers him first a cup from which he drinks and then gently wipes his brow with a cloth.

"The screen layout calls to mind certain religious paintings where a vision often appears in a top corner of the canvas, normally the Virgin Mary, Christ ascended in his glory or a ministering angel. The chalice, cloth and comforting hand are similarly images commonly found in religious paintings." Beckett’s cameraman, Jim Lewis said that:

"… at the moment when the drops of perspiration are wiped from the brow of the character, Beckett simply said that the cloth alluded to the veil that Veronica used to wipe the brow of Jesus on the Way of the Cross. The imprint of Christ’s face remains on the cloth."

"The play could have been sentimental, even maudlin. The mysterious quality of the action, the beauty of the singing … and the specificity of the repeated, almost ritualistic patterns avoid this. What, on the printed page, seems a very slight piece, acquires on the screen a strange, haunting beauty." One has to assume, using the same logic as Beckett did with Quad II, that the dream/memory/fantasy is winding down and that, if it was to receive a third run through, it would be slower again suggesting that it is fading away. Perhaps even now it is no longer accessible consciously, only via the unconscious. "In Beckett’s production for German television a central door, not mentioned in the text, was shown in the shots of A, disappearing in the shots of B, as though A had entered the world of B through the door of memory."

But why use such Judeo-Christocentric imagery when so much of his more famous work revolves around life in a godless universe? As he conceded to Colin Duckworth, "Christianity is a mythology with which I am perfectly familiar, so I naturally use it". One might imagine Beckett appending the same disclaimer he applied to Berkeley’s philosophy in Film: "No truth value attaches to above, regarded as of merely structural and dramatic convenience"
