= Ohio Impromptu =

1981 play by Samuel Beckett

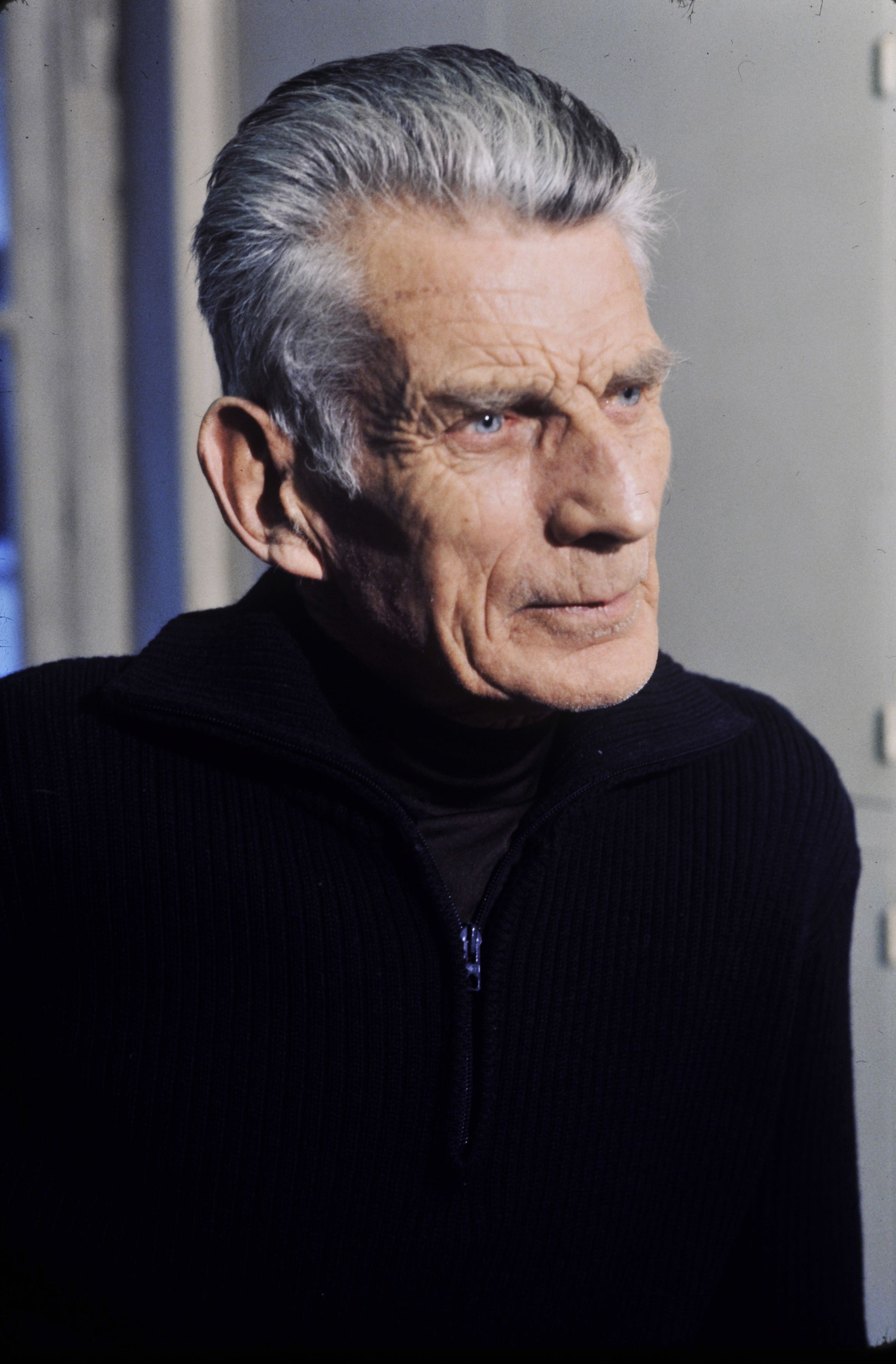
Samuel Beckett, 1977

Ohio Impromptu is a "playlet" by Samuel Beckett.

Written in English in 1980, it began as a favour to S.E. Gontarski, who requested a dramatic piece to be performed at an academic symposium in Columbus, Ohio, in honour of Beckett's seventy-fifth birthday. Beckett was uncomfortable writing to order and struggled with the piece for nine months before it was ready. It was first performed on 9 May 1981 at the Stadium II Theater; Alan Schneider directed with David Warrilow as "Reader" and Rand Mitchell as "Listener".

"It is the first Beckett play to present a Doppelgänger on stage, another Beckett pair, but this time seen as mirror images; it belongs to Beckett's ghost period, where phantoms that echo the haunting quality of memory and nostalgia in his work are seen or described on stage."

== Synopsis ==
=== Characters and action ===
Two old men are sitting at right angles to each other beside a rectangular table. They are "[a]s alike in appearance as possible" both wearing long black coats and possessing long white hair. The table is white as are the chairs. The character known as "Listener" is facing the audience but his head is bowed and his face hidden. The other character, "Reader's" posture is similar the only difference being that he has a book in front of him open at the last pages. A single "[b]lack wide-brimmed hat" is sitting on the table. The characters "could have been borrowed from Rembrandt" or from Gerard ter Borch's Four Spanish Monks although no specific painting was suggested by Beckett himself as an inspiration. "Rubin's figure-ground experiments" have also been suggested.

As soon as Reader starts to read Listener knocks on the table with his left hand at which point Reader pauses, repeats the last full sentence and then waits for a further knock on the table before recommencing. This continues throughout the entire reading and is reminiscent of "Krapp's earlier relishing in selected passages from his tapes." "At one point the Listener stops the Reader from turning back to an earlier page to which the text refers, and at another the Reader pauses at a seemingly ungrammatical structure in the text, says, 'Yes'—his one 'impromptu' remark—and re-reads it. Other than that one word he only vocalises exactly what is printed on the page.

Listener makes Reader repeat the last sentence of his tale and then the book is closed. "Nothing is left to tell" and yet Listener insists on knocking one last time but there is nothing more to read. The two look at each other without blinking until the light fades.

=== The story ===
The narrative, written in the past tense, tells a story of someone, possibly Listener himself, who in a "last attempt to obtain relief" following the loss of a loved one, moves away to the Isle of Swans, a place where they never had been together. In doing this he completely disregards their warning, when they appeared to him in a dream: "Stay where we were so long alone together, my shade will comfort you."

He soon realises that he has made "a terrible mistake. Familiar surroundings could have soothed and 'sedated' him through their long association with his loved one, but unfamiliar surroundings accentuate his total sense of deprivation. In his bereaved state, everything conspires to remind him of what he has lost." For whatever reason he is unable to go back, to undo what he had done. He is plagued by night terrors, something he had suffered from in the past, so far back in fact it was "as if [they had] never been." As a result, he finds he can't sleep.

However, one night (which could just as easily have been "Once upon a time"), as he is sitting with his head in his hands and trembling all over, a man appears from nowhere. He explains that he has been sent by the man's loved one to bring him comfort, at which point he pulls "a worn volume from the pocket of his long black coat and [reads from it] till dawn", after which he vanishes without another word. We learn that it is a "sad tale", but no more. This continues night after night: the man appears "unheralded" and "without preamble" begins to read, and disappears at dawn "without a word".

Eventually, the "loved one" determines that this has gone on long enough. After completing his reading one last time, the man remains and explains that this will be his final appearance. He has been told that his comforting is no longer needed and he is no longer empowered to return even if he wanted to. For a time the two, who through the many nights of readings had grown "to be as one", sit on in silence buried in "profounds of mind … as though turned to stone".

David Warrilow recalls Beckett's advice to him when he undertook the role: "Now, the most useful intention that Beckett gave me early on in the Ohio Impromptu experience was to treat it like a bedtime story and let it be soothing."

== Biographical insights ==
"Beckett served for a time as Joyce's amanuensis … the two men used to walk together on the Isle of Swans during the thirties and … Joyce used to wear a Latin Quarter hat." Beckett confirmed these details with reference to the piece during a dinner conversation with James Knowlson. "Of course," he said. Knowlson then mentioned that he had heard people refer to the "dear face" "as if it too were the face of Joyce". Knowlson believed it was actually a woman and Beckett concurred: "It's Suzanne … I've imagined her dead so many times. I've even imagined myself trudging out to her grave." "When he wrote Ohio Impromptu [his wife] was eighty years old [and although for some time they lived quite separate lives they] had nonetheless remained a couple for over forty years" and "the thought of Suzanne dying was intolerable to him."

The character in the story is plagued by night terrors and insomnia, as was Beckett. All his life he was troubled by nightmares. "His insomnia was probably inherited, from his mother, who suffered from the same … complaint. In the 1930s Beckett also began to experience panic attacks. "Chief among these was a feeling of suffocation, which often came on him in his room as night was falling.

The title of the play deserves some comment: Ohio Impromptu is a "straightforwardly descriptive [title], marking occasion and genre – impromptus à la Molière and Giraudoux (which were metatheatrical or self-reflexive exercises) – or more like the intricate little solo pieces Schubert, Chopin and Schumann called impromptus. "In promising an impromptu – a performance without preparation – the title of the play subverts its own promise when followed by a text which allows no extemporaneous composition, no improvisation on the part of the actors.

"'Ohio' is [also] the answer of an American children's riddle which goes "What is high in the middle and round at the ends?" or "What is high in the middle and nothing at the ends?" ... This gives the central theme of Beckett's play: two voids or 'nothings' – birth and death – and between the high of life."

== Interpretation ==
Critics differ in their interpretations of who or what Reader is. Whether an apparition, Listener's alter ego or an alternate aspect of his mind the nightly 'reading' is clearly an essential part of Listener's healing process. Beckett theatre specialist Anna McMullan claims that "[i]n both Rockaby and Ohio Impromptu the speaking of the text becomes a rite of passage which enacts a transformation – from loss to comfort, from life to death and from speech to silence." In Rockaby, the woman has stayed on in the family home after her mother's death; Listener has elected to run away.

"As with Company, the author again returns to a theme he has portrayed many times, that loneliness and nostalgia are too personal, after a certain age, to be shared with any being other than oneself." "The image of the river (the Seine) with its two arms flowing into one another after they have divided to flow around the island… is a clue to the meaning of the play. For at its emotional centre lies sadness, loss and solitude, contrasted with a memory of togetherness." So why does Listener move to the Isle of Swans rather than away? The location may have had a certain meaning for Beckett-the-person but Beckett-the-writer chose it more for its geographical features, the two rivers merging into one and also the fact that a smaller version of the Statue of Liberty stands on the isle representing the literal New World that Ohio is part of and the metaphorical new world that Listener moves to.

The arrangement of figures actually "resembles the figures used in the psychological experiments early [in the 20th] century to establish the principle of closure." The divided self is a common means of approach to Beckettian texts and has been applied to Krapp's Last Tape, Footfalls, That Time and even Waiting for Godot.

Beckett may have had his own wife in mind when he wrote the play but he goes to some pains never to specify the name or gender of the loved one. This gives the text extra depth. The man could be grieving for a father or, more likely bearing in mind Beckett's other works, his mother. Also there is nothing to prevent the loved one being a male partner and homoerotic readings of Beckett's work are not uncommon.

As regards Reader, Gontarski himself has argued that what we are seeing is effectively a dramatisation of "the elemental creative process... suggested in That Time, where the protagonist of narrative A would hide as a youth, 'making up talk breaking up two or more talking to himself being together that way'."

Others suggest that Reader is the "shade", some kind of spectral emissary, despatched by Listener's dead lover to help him through the grieving process. In an early draft of the play Beckett had focussed "on a ghost returning from the Underworld to speak at... a conference"; the only vestige of that remaining is the pun on "White nights" – Whiteknights, Reading is where a great many of his manuscripts are now preserved and the address of the Beckett International Foundation.

"The narrative echoes (but does not replicate or anticipate) the stag(ed) image." "In the text we are told that the figures remain: 'Buried in who knows what profounds of mind'. On stage, however, they raise their heads to meet each other's eyes in meaningful contemplation." It is therefore equally plausible that the two men on stage are not the same as the two men in the story. "Like an author, Listener occasionally calls for the repeat of a phrase, but Reader has his own agency, repeating a phrase unbidden at least once." One factor that suggests this might not be the case is the fact that there is only one hat between the two of them.

After the story has been read and the book closed Listener knocks once more, the signal to begin again from where Reader had left off. "What do words say when there is nothing left to tell" however? Beckett was obsessed by a desire to create what he called a "literature of the unword", and the play represents another example of this effort.

=== Beckett on film ===
In Charles Sturridge's 2002 film adaptation of Ohio Impromptu for the Beckett on Film project, modern cinematic techniques allowed Reader and Listener to both be played by the same actor (Jeremy Irons), literally fulfilling Beckett's instruction that the two characters should be "as alike in appearance as possible" and following the interpretation that they are really elements in the one personality. In the text, the pair only look directly at each other at the very end. In this production, however, they communicate visually throughout.

Anna McMullan criticized this filmic interpretation of Ohio Impromptu as being "led once again by a psychologized approach to performance [since] Jeremy Irons plays both parts and the 'ghost' fades away at dawn".

== Online references ==
- Beckett's dying remains: The Process of Playwriting in the Ohio Impromptu Manuscripts
- Dramatic Texts of Samuel Beckett
