= The Unnamable (novel) =

Novel by Samuel Beckett

- First edition (French)
- Author: Samuel Beckett
- Original title: L'Innommable
- Translator: Samuel Beckett
- Language: French
- Series: The Trilogy #3
- Publisher: Les Éditions de Minuit
- Publication date: 1953
- Publication place: France
- English publication date: 1958
- Preceded by: Malone Dies

The Unnamable is a 1953 novel by Samuel Beckett. It was originally published in French as L'Innommable and later translated by the author into English. Grove Press published the English edition in 1958.

== As part of the Trilogy ==
Following the completion of Malone Dies in 1948, Beckett spent three months writing Waiting for Godot before beginning work on The Unnamable, which he completed in 1950. The Unnamable is the final volume in Beckett's "Trilogy" of novels, after Molloy and Malone Dies. As Benjamin Kunkel observes, "The trilogy proceeds by way of collapse. Beckett’s successive monologuists, confined to a series of small rooms, try and fail to tell their stories; and each narrator is then revealed to be the alias, and each story the alibi, of its successor, until, pulling all of Beckett’s earlier creations down upon its nonexistent head, there is only the disembodied voice of the Unnamable." In this way, according to Gabriel Josipovici, "Beckett’s trilogy returns us to oral literature, to an art more honest and more immediate than that of the novel." More so than elsewhere in the trilogy, the themes of The Unnamable are explicitly spiritual, concerned with the search for the self, the meaning of existence, and the cause and cessation of suffering.

...now it comes back to me, what it can possibly be, and where it can possibly come from, since all is silent here, and the walls thick, and how I manage, without feeling an ear on me, or a head, or a body, or a soul, how I manage, to do what, how I manage, it's not clear, dear dear, you say it's not clear, something is wanting to make it clear, I'll seek, what is wanting, to make everything clear, I'm always seeking something, it's tiring in the end, and it's only the beginning, how I manage, under such conditions, to do what I'm doing, what am I doing, I must find out what I'm doing, tell me what you're doing and I'll ask you how it's possible, I hear, you say I hear, and that I seek, it's a lie, I seek nothing, nothing any more, no matter...

== Structure and summary ==
The Unnamable consists entirely of a disjointed monologue from the perspective of an unnamed (presumably unnamable) and immobile protagonist: the narrator’s body is successively described as curled in the fetal position, as a limbless body stuck in a deep glass jar, and as a featureless egg-like creature. There is no concrete plot or setting, and it is debatable whether or not the other characters ("Mahood" [formerly "Basil"], "Madeleine" and "Worm") actually exist or whether they are facets of the narrator himself. The protagonist also claims authorship of the main characters in the two previous novels of the trilogy, as well as Beckett's earlier novels Murphy, Mercier and Camier, and Watt. The Unnamable is a mix of recollections and existential musings on the part of its narrator, many of which pertain specifically to the possibility that the narrator is constructed by the language he speaks: "I’m in words, made of words, others’ words, what others, the place too, the air, the walls, the floor, the ceiling, all words, the whole world is here with me, I’m the air, the walls, the walled in one, everything yields, opens, ebbs, flows…"

Similar to the structure of Molloy, the first book in the trilogy, The Unnamable begins with what the narrator describes as a "preamble" of about 13 pages, which is then followed by a single extended paragraph that comprises the remainder of the novel. According to Paul Foster, "The long paragraph that constitutes this novel is a form that reflects this relentlessness, an uninterrupted determination to bring the whole intractable [existential, spiritual] dilemma forward into the light and to reveal it for what it is."

== Musical settings ==
Luciano Berio's musical work Sinfonia uses sections of The Unnamable, along with the music of Gustav Mahler and quotes from many other famous compositions, for its third movement.

Earl Kim's musical work, "Exercises en Route," composed 1963–70, sets passages from The Unnamable in its final movement, "Rattling On".

== BBC broadcast ==
A reading of selected passages from The Unnamable was broadcast on the BBC Third Programme on 19 January 1959, and repeated on 10 February. Beckett selected the passages, which were read by the actor Patrick Magee, and incidental music for strings was composed by Samuel's cousin John S. Beckett. The producer was Donald McWhinnie.
