= Not I =

Dramatic monologue by Samuel Beckett

Not I is a short dramatic monologue written in 1972 (20 March to 1 April) by Samuel Beckett which was premiered at the "Samuel Beckett Festival" by the Repertory Theater of Lincoln Center, New York (22 November 1972).

== Synopsis ==
Not I takes place in a pitch-black space illuminated only by a single beam of light. This spotlight fixes on an actress's mouth about eight feet above the stage, everything else being blacked out and, in early performances, illuminates the shadowy figure of the Auditor who makes four increasingly ineffectual movements "of helpless compassion" during brief breaks in the monologue where Mouth appears to be listening to some inner voice unheard by the audience.

The mouth utters jumbled sentences at a ferocious pace, which obliquely tell the story of a woman of about seventy who was abandoned by her parents after a premature birth and has lived a loveless, mechanical existence, and who appears to have suffered an unspecified traumatic experience. The woman has been virtually mute since childhood apart from occasional outbursts, one of which comprises the text we hear. From the text it could be inferred that the woman had been raped but this is something Beckett was very clear about when asked. "How could you think of such a thing! No, no, not at all—it wasn’t that at all." It seems more likely that she has suffered some kind of collapse, possibly even her death, while "wandering in a field … looking aimlessly for cowslips."

The woman relates four incidents from her life: lying face down in the grass, standing in a supermarket, sitting on a "mound in Croker's Acre" (a real place in Ireland near Leopardstown racecourse) and "that time at court", each being preceded by a repeat on the repressed first ‘scene’ which has been likened to an epiphany; whatever happened to her in that field in April was the trigger for her to start talking.

Her initial reaction to the paralyzing event is to assume she is being punished by God but finds she is not suffering; she feels no pain, as in life she felt no pleasure. She cannot think why she might be being punished but accepts that God does not need a "particular reason" for what he does. She thinks she has something to confess and believes that if she goes over the events of her life for long enough it will be revealed to her. In addition to the continued buzzing in her skull there is now a light of varying intensity tormenting her; the two seem related.

The title comes from the character's repeated denial that the events she describes, or alludes to, happened to her.

== Mouth ==
Beckett had always intended that Billie Whitelaw, whom he had worked with on Play, give the definitive premiere performance of Not I. "But in the end, more out of friendship than because of any delays in London, he allowed Alan Schneider the opportunity to present it first" in America featuring Jessica Tandy. Tandy did fly to France to discuss the text with Beckett. However, Whitelaw’s subsequent performances benefited from extensive coaching from Beckett.

"I knew that woman in Ireland," Beckett said, "I knew who she was — not 'she' specifically, one single woman, but there were so many of those old crones, stumbling down the lanes, in the ditches, besides the hedgerows." That said, Beckett did not demand that the part be spoken with an accent, his one concession to Whitelaw when tutoring her. Schneider put ten questions to Beckett, indicative of his bafflement. Beckett responded: "I no more know where she is or why thus than she does. All I know is in the text. 'She' is purely a stage entity, part of a stage image and purveyor of a stage text. The rest is Ibsen."

Objective meaning does seem to have been of secondary consideration in the writing style. As Beckett indicated to Tandy he hoped that the piece would "work on the nerves of the audience, not its intellect." Beckett told Tandy to consider the mouth "an organ of emission, without intellect" and "during rehearsals [with Whitelaw] he would say, 'Too much colour, too much colour', which she correctly interpreted as 'For God’s sake, don’t act'."

The visual image of the mouth was, according to Beckett in a letter postmarked 30 April 1974, suggested by Caravaggio's The Beheading of Saint John the Baptist in Valletta Cathedral.

== Auditor ==
The published stage directions also call for a character of indeterminate sex referred to as 'the Auditor' (generally played by a male) who wears a black robe and can be dimly seen stage left. When Beckett came to be involved in staging the play, he found that he was unable to place the Auditor in a stage position that pleased him, and consequently allowed the character to be omitted from those productions. However, he chose not to cut the character from the published script, and whether or not the character is used in production seems to be at the discretion of individual producers. As he wrote to two American directors in 1986: "He is very difficult to stage (light--position) and may well be of more harm than good. For me the play needs him but I can do without him. I have never seen him function effectively." In the 1978 Paris production he did reinstate the character but from then on abandoned the image concluding, as he had once said, that it was perhaps "an error of the creative imagination."

It has been suggested that the image of the Auditor was inspired by the image of a djellaba-clad "intense listener" seen from a café in Tunis; Beckett was in Morocco for a month from February to March 1972. James Knowlson conjectures that this "figure coalesced with [Beckett’s] sharp memories of the Caravaggio painting" mentioned above. In this painting there "is an old woman standing to Salome's left. She observes the decapitation with horror, covering her ears rather than her eyes" a gesture that Beckett added in the 1978 Paris production.

When Schneider questioned him as to whether the Auditor was Death or a guardian angel, Beckett shrugged his shoulders, lifted his arms and let them fall to his sides, leaving the ambiguity wholly intact.

== Significant productions ==
=== 22 November 1972 ===
Forum Theatre, Lincoln Center, New York, directed by Alan Schneider, with Jessica Tandy (Mouth) and Henderson Forsythe (Auditor).

Jessica Tandy found the experience of acting Not I terrifying. At first she had problems remembering the text and had to rely on a TelePrompTer right in front of her. Because the play was being performed in the round she had to be installed in a box, which could be wheeled on and off the stage. Inside this ‘contraption’ she stood holding onto two iron bars on either side of the box. She was dressed in black and wore a hood, which made her feel like "an old English hangman". At first her head was held still by a strap but she found it unbearable and unnecessary and asked for it to be removed. They also had an operator hidden in the box to reset the focus on the mouth if it did drift slightly out of the light. Additionally, her teeth were coated with a substance that exaggerated their brightness and then polished to attract the glare.

=== 16 January 1973 ===
Royal Court Theatre, London, directed by Anthony Page, with Billie Whitelaw (Mouth).

Initially, Whitelaw wanted to stand on a dais but she found this did not work for her so she allowed herself to be strapped in a chair called an "artist's rest" on which a film actor wearing armour rests because he cannot sit down. Her entire body was draped in black; her face covered with black gauze with a black transparent slip for her eyes and her head was clamped between two pieces of sponge rubber so that her mouth would remain fixed in the spotlight. Finally a bar was fixed which she could cling to and on to which she could direct her tension. She was unable to use a visual aid and so memorised the text.

"Whitelaw has described the ordeal of playing Mouth, how she was totally cut off from others, high above the stage, clamped, swathed in a black hood, subject to panic attacks; after the dress rehearsal she was for a time totally disoriented. Yet this stage experience came to seem her most meaningful one. She heard in Mouth’s outpourings her own 'inner scream': 'I found so much of my self in Not I. Somewhere in there were my entrails under a microscope.'"

=== 17 April 1977 ===
BBC2, The Lively Arts: Shades, Three Plays by Samuel Beckett: Arguably the definitive performance of the piece albeit in a completely different medium from which it was originally intended. Not I on its own was re-broadcast on 7 February 1990. The British Film Institute database says this is a film of the 1973 Royal Court Theatre performance above but it appears this was actually filmed on 13 February 1975 with Billie Whitelaw reprising the role. In this production the Auditor is absent and the camera stays fixed on her mouth, everything else being blacked out with makeup.

A criticism of this interpretation is that the focus shifts from the aural to the visual as the image of Whitelaw’s mouth dominates the screen and has often been likened to a vagina attempting to give birth to the self. This is a point Beckett himself picked up on when first viewing the video though one to which he raised no objection.

=== 11 April 1978 ===
Théâtre d'Orsay, Paris: Whereas in the French premiere (8 April 1975), Beckett allowed the role of the Auditor to be dropped, in the subsequent performance he both reinstated the position and gave it greater prominence lighting it from above but only at times when Mouth renounces the first person singular. In addition to covering his head with his hands at the end, Beckett also added "a gesture of blame" to the French version. Both this and the 1975 performance featured Madeleine Renaud.

=== 27 February 1993 ===
Performed by Tricia Kelly, directed by Cathy Denford, at West Yorkshire Playhouse.

=== February 2000 ===
Beckett on Film, Shepperton Studios: This filmed production, directed by Neil Jordan begins differently from the BBC version in that the viewer sees Julianne Moore come into view, sit down and then the light hit her mouth. Because of this the audience is aware that a young woman as opposed to an "old hag" is portraying the protagonist.

=== 9 April 2006 ===
Beckett Evening, BBC Radio 3: To mark the centenary of Beckett’s birth, the BBC produced a number of radio programmes including a recording of Not I by Juliet Stevenson who had played the role on stage. Despite the lack of visuals her performance garnered favourable reviews. Of note is the fact that she chose to speak with an accent.

=== 2005 onwards ===
Performed by Lisa Dwan, firstly in London's Battersea Arts Centre in 2005. Dwan was interviewed with Billie Whitelaw as part of the Beckett celebrations on BBC Radio 3. Dwan performed the piece again in July 2009 in the Southbank Centre in London in a time of nine minutes and fifty seconds; it usually plays for anything between twelve and fifteen minutes. The performance has since toured around the world, garnering five star reviews.

=== 28 February 2018 ===
Touretteshero's inclusive presentation of Not I opened at Battersea Arts Centre in February 2018. Jess Thom viewed Mouth as a disabled character; comparing her experience of Tourette’s to Mouth’s experience of not having control over her body and speech. The relaxed performance featured integrated British Sign Language (BSL), performed by Charmaine Wombwell, and questioned who is allowed to access theatre as well as the cultural curation of accessible theatre. It was followed by a TV programme, Me, My Mouth and I, airing on BBC2, as part of the Performance Live strand.

=== 8 June 2024 ===
Jeni Jones performed her self-directed Not I at the Hudson Theatre in Los Angeles, CA on June 8, 2024 as part of the Hollywood Fringe Festival on a double bill with Fibonacci Ascending, which was also directed by Jones.

=== 2025 onwards ===
In 2025, Jeni Jones debuted a double bill of Samuel Beckett's Not I and Rockaby at the Broadwater Theatre in Hollywood, CA and produced multiple runs through her company Plank Productions. With a mission to liberate Beckett's texts from the technological and psychological constraints inhibiting previous productions, Jeni has performed Not I throughout 2025 and 2026 at UCLA, University of Edinburgh, the Drama Bookshop in New York, and various other non-traditional spaces, such as the Bel Ami art gallery in Los Angeles. Opting to simply "not move" rather than to be tied to a board or constrained while performing the character Mouth, as was the case in previous productions, Jeni's performance at the Samuel Beckett Conference in Scotland was well received and reviewed for its innovation and diversion from past modalities in the 50th Anniversary Edition of the Journal of Beckett Studies. In addition to the innovation of her "pop-up style" productions, which she continues to perform around the world, Jeni Jones includes the Auditor. Jeni's record-breaking running time of Not I is notable for being under eight minutes.

== Reception ==
In 1998, David Benedict of The Independent argued that Not I is a "finer, more dramatically distilled" work than Waiting for Godot (1953). He referred to it as a "searingly beautiful depiction of humanity through the mouth of a woman. A truly unforgettable piece of dramatic writing".

== Related texts ==
=== "Kilcool" ===
On 28 August 1963, shortly after completing work on Film, Beckett began working on a new notebook which included several fragments of writing. There are four separate outlines in the 'Kilcool manuscript' which Stan Gontarski describes as 'episodes'. Analysis of the manuscript by Rosemary Pountey and Stan Gontarski suggests that 'Kilcool' is an early forerunner to what later became the visual and textual themes of Not I. In early drafts, a female voice describes a move to Kilcool (which is misspelt - Beckett later amends the mistake). Beckett’s father had once rented a house in Kilcoole, a small marshy village in Co. Wicklow, Ireland. The first outline describes a monologue spoken by a woman (only the face is visible) who has lost both parents and has moved to Kilcool(e) to live with a 'widowed childless aunt'. Stage outlines specify a "woman's face alone in constant light. Nothing but fixed lit face and speech." throughout the four outlines. In later drafts, Beckett eliminated almost all naturalistic detail in order to focus on more abstract narrative themes such as memory, compulsive speech and death.

=== The Unnamable ===
Asked further about sources for Not I, Beckett referred questioners back to his own novel, The Unnamable with its clamouring voice longing for silence, circular narrative and concern about avoiding the first person pronoun: "I shall not say I again, ever again". Vivian Mercier in his book Beckett/Beckett goes as far as to suggest that, gender aside, Not I is effectively a dramatisation of The Unnamable.

=== That Time ===
On 8 June 1973 Beckett began to imagine the play that came to be That Time which he called later "a brother to Not I". This play also owes something to the Kilcool Manuscript. In it Beckett returns to the image of a human head – of an old man this time – illuminated in the darkness and assailed on all sides by three voices – all his – from earlier in his life. At one point the voice designated as C says "did you ever say I to yourself in your life"
