= Suzanne Dechevaux-Dumesnil =

Lover, then wife of Samuel Beckett (1900–1989)

- Born: Suzanne Georgette Anna Déchevaux-Dumesnil; 7 January 1900; Argenteuil, France
- Died: 17 July 1989 (aged 89); Paris, France
- Burial place: Montparnasse Cemetery, Paris
- Known for: lover and later wife of Samuel Beckett
- Spouse: Samuel Beckett (m. 1961)

Suzanne Georgette Anna Déchevaux-Dumesnil (7 January 1900 – 17 July 1989) was a French pianist who was the wife of writer Samuel Beckett.

== Relationship with Beckett ==
In the 1930s, Beckett chose Déchevaux-Dumesnil as his lover over the heiress Peggy Guggenheim. Six years older than Beckett, Déchevaux-Dumesnil was an austere woman known for avant-garde tastes and left-wing politics. She was a pianist.

During the Second World War, Beckett joined the French Resistance. For over two years, he and Déchevaux-Dumesnil hid from the Germans in a village in the South of France.

Beckett's Waiting for Godot has been called "a metaphor for the long walk into Roussillon, when Beckett and Suzanne slept in haystacks... during the day and walked by night..."

During the relationship between Beckett and Déchevaux-Dumesnil, which lasted more than 50 years, she maintained a private circle of friends and is credited with having influenced Beckett to produce more work.

During the late 1950s, Beckett often stayed in London, where he met Barbara Bray, a BBC script-editor, a widow in her 30s. James Knowlson writes of them: "Beckett seems to have been immediately attracted to her and she to him. Their encounter was highly significant for them both, for it represented the beginning of a relationship that was to last, in parallel with that with Suzanne, for the rest of his life." Soon, their association became "a very intimate and personal one". In a visit to Paris in January 1961, Bray told Beckett she had decided to move there. His response was unusual. In March 1961, he married Déchevaux-Dumesnil in a civil ceremony in Folkestone. On the face of it, this was to make sure that, if he died before her, Déchevaux-Dumesnil would inherit the rights to his work because there was no common-law marriage under French law. He may also have wanted to affirm his loyalty to her. In June 1961, Bray moved to Paris, and despite his recent marriage, Beckett spent much of his time with her. This side of his life was not well known, as Beckett's reserve was "allied to his fear of giving offence to Suzanne". Beckett's play Play (1963) may have been inspired by these events.

Déchevaux-Dumesnil died at age 89 in July 1989, five months before Beckett. They were interred together in the cimetière du Montparnasse in Paris.
