= Rockaby =

Literary work by Samuel Beckett

Rockaby is a short one-woman play by Samuel Beckett. It was written in English in 1980, at the request of Daniel Labeille, who produced it on behalf of Programs in the Arts, State University of New York, for a festival and symposium in commemoration of Beckett's 75th birthday. The play premiered on April 8, 1981, at the State University of New York at Buffalo, starring Billie Whitelaw and directed by Alan Schneider. A documentary film, Rockaby, by D. A. Pennebaker and Chris Hegedus records the rehearsal process and the first performance. This production went on to be performed at the Annex at La MaMa Experimental Theatre Club, and, in December 1982, at the Cottesloe, Royal National Theatre, London. The production was performed Off-Broadway at The Samuel Beckett Theater on Theatre Row in New York City, from February 16, 1984 through April 22, 1984. Puerto Rican actress and director Victoria Espinosa took a role in the play when she was in her 90s.

== Synopsis ==
A woman dressed in an evening gown is sitting in a wooden rocking chair; no other props or scenery are called for. She sits totally still until the very end of the play. The chair apparently starts and stops "rocking of its own accord, since her feet are visible on its footrest. The motion creates a ghostly atmosphere." The woman (W) is described in the notes as "Prematurely old. Unkempt grey hair. Huge eyes in white expressionless face." Beckett is equally specific when it comes to the gown: "Black lacy high-necked … Long sleeves. Jet sequins … Incongruous headdress set with extravagant trimming to catch the light."

As she rocks she hears a "dull, expressionless" pre-recorded voice (V) – her own – recount details from her own life, and that of her dead mother's, in what Enoch Brater describes as "a performance poem in the shape of a play."

"The French title, Berceuse, means both ‘rocking chair’ and ‘lullaby’, while the English Rockaby refers to a traditional lullaby in which a baby's cradle falls from a treetop, thus bring together in one song the images of birth and death which are so often juxtaposed in Beckett." Both a traditional cradle and a rocking chair have rockers. "[T]he synchrony of the rocking motion and the dimeter verse line – one back-and-forth per line – plays against the recorded narrative." To achieve this effect Billie Whitelaw was encouraged by Beckett to "‘think of it as a lullaby’ which she interpreted as ‘soft, monotonous, no colour, soothing, rhythmic … [a] drive toward death."

another creature there
somewhere there
behind the pane
another living soul
one other living soul
till the end came
in the end came
close of a long day

— From Rockaby (1980)

The play can be broken down into four sections. All begin with the childlike demand, "More" (consider Oliver Twist’s request for more gruel). Billie Whitelaw pronounced it more like ‘maw’ – a pun – "to suggest a need for nourishment" or even "Ma".

Intermittently, she joins in three of the lines: ‘time she stopped’, ‘living soul’ and ‘rock her off’" at which point the rocking stops and only starts again when she demands "More," each time a little softer than the time before. The fact that time play begins with this word indicates that this scene has been being played out for some time before this. At the end of the final section the woman fails to join in with the voice, the rocking ceases and the woman's head slowly inclines; "she has apparently died."

=== Section 1 ===
"The first section details W’s decision to stop going ‘to and fro’ in the outside world in search of ‘another like herself’" evocative of Molloy’s quest to find his mother. The voice’s speech is fragmented and simple "creating an affinity between the language of the child and that of senescence and dying." This could also be a reason for the "huge eyes".

As with Not I, the voice speaks in the third person.

=== Section 2 ===
The second section reprises and therefore emphasizes the decision taken in Section 1. It also marks the "beginning of her next phase of activity – sitting at her upstairs window, searching the windows opposite to see another ‘one living soul … like herself.’"

"Life is nothing more nor less than the act of perception or the state of being perceived, or, in the words of Bishop Berkeley which find echoes throughout Beckett’s work, ‘esse est percipi’ (‘to be is to be perceived’). She sees no one however and is seen by no one. "Voice has become the woman’s own Berkeleyan observer, without whose surveillance any claim to existence would be invalidated."

=== Section 3 ===
In the third section the woman has lowered her standards again. She would be content now to simply see a raised blind as evidence of life. At the end of this section she realises it is "time she stopped" even this activity.

"A drawn blind [is] and old custom signifying death" and the last thing she does herself before sitting down in the old rocker is "let down the blind" before closing her own eyelids. This decision [is] first announced in part three by the lines ‘till the day came/in the end came/close of a long day’ reiterated at the opening of part four.

"The objects surrounding [the] ‘window’ endow it with layers of feeling. ‘Pane’ and ‘blind’ imply more than the things of windows, and ironically comment on the classical metaphor of ‘window’ as ‘eyes of the soul.’"

=== Section 4 ===
In the final "section V describes W’s relocation downstairs to sit in her mother’s rocking chair where she will wait for death" in exactly the same manner as her mother before her.

The action on stage becomes concurrent with the narration which becomes a "little softer each time" until the rocking stops completely. She has stopped actively searching for another and given up watching for proof of the existence of another, but through all of this she has always had the voice for company; now she is "done with that" too and has concluded that it is time she herself "was her own other ... living soul."

The fact that "the word ‘down’ is repeated six times in the first seven lines of this final section, while it is used only once in the preceding sections (‘all blinds down’) ... coupled with the play's first mention of the ‘steep stair’, gives verbal shape to the internal descent that is about to be recounted. The woman is descending into the depths of her self." Billie Whitelaw has said: "[The voice of the woman in Rockaby] gets softer because she's getting weaker, and the rock of the chair should be lessening, and the light is lessening. ... In fact, the woman in Rockaby is actually going further and further down that steep stair. So with the last ‘More’ she knows she's on the way out, and as long as that rocker keeps rocking she's all right. Once it stops she's gone... I do find it very frightening to do. And I find it desperately lonely to do. I feel very, very lonely in that chair."

"In French, ‘chair’ means flesh, especially naked flesh, so that the combined image of ‘rocking chair,’ ‘mother rocker,’ and ‘rocking flesh’ bring together inside a single word two realities of subject and object, the object being endowed with subjective realism."

The woman selects what initially appears like an unusual outfit for this final scene, an elaborate evening gown. Whether this was the one her mother used when she went through the same steps is unclear; it does however "marks both the uniqueness of the occasion of her retreat to the rocking chair and, as well, her re-enactment of her mother’s action. Whatever her motive in wearing this dress, it constitutes a remnant of an earlier life."

It has been suggested that the "other" that the woman has been searching for all this time is actually her mother. There is clearly an underlying text here of a little lost girl looking for her ‘mammy’. Having abandoned the search she opts for the rocker's "embrace" ("those arms at last") dolled up as her mother so that she can fulfil both roles, she can become her "own other". "Other" and "mother" sound very similar. As Molloy puts it: "I have her room. I sleep in her bed ... I have taken her place. I must resemble her more and more.

== Background ==
time she stopped
sitting at her window
quiet at her window
only window
facing other windows
only other windows
all eyes
all sides
high and low
time she stopped

— From Rockaby (1980)

Although Billie Whitelaw has very much made the role of W her own, it is not strictly true that the part was written specifically for her, even though in a letter to The Actors' Equity Association in 1982 Beckett intimated that it had been. "In his original letter asking Beckett for the play, Labeille had directly associated the name of Irene Worth … with the project." Whitelaw only came to play the part because Worth was offered a film role and the opening of the play could not be postponed to accommodate her. Beckett declared himself "very pleased with switch to Billie" and her performance benefited from a high degree of support from him as always.

As with all Beckett's later plays it is clear he has drawn again on personal memories. "There was the frail figure of his maternal grandmother, ‘little Granny’, Annie Roe, dressed in ‘her best black’, sitting in a rocking chair at the window of Cooldrinagh, where she lived out the final years of her life. The woman in the play gazes out at other windows for ‘another living soul’, as Beckett himself sat, often for hours on end, staring at the rows of cell windows on the grey Santé prison" which backed his apartment in the Boulevard Saint-Jacques.

Needless to say, knowing Beckett to be the art lover he was, one can catch glimpses of a number of paintings he was familiar with: Whistler's Mother, van Gogh’s La Berceuse or Rembrandt’s Margaretha Trip (de Geer) . A favourite of his, Beckett owned a copy of Jack B Yeats’s exhibition catalogue, which included one entitled Sleep, a painting of an old woman a sitting by the window, with her head drooped low onto her chest.

== Related texts ==
=== Krapp’s Last Tape ===
As Krapp sits on the "bench by the weir" he realises his mother has passed on when "the blind went down, one of those dirty brown roller affairs." In 1950 Beckett himself sat beside his dying mother's bed "until he could stand it no more [and] went for a walk along the Grand Canal. [When] he returned to the nursing home [he] sat outside for a while on a bench, shivering in the evening wind. When he looked up at her window, he saw the shade go down, the signal she had died.

=== Murphy ===
Murphy’s rocking chair is the one possession to which he is attached. It gives his body pleasure and sets free his mind. "The chair asserts the pun ‘off his rocker’" which could similarly refer to the dead mother in Rockaby who people maintained had "gone off her head".

=== Film ===
"The room in Film contains a rocking chair with a carved headrest, which when ‘O’ sits back, frames his head. His rocking matches his emotions as he gazes at various images of himself and when ‘E’ finally violates the angle of immunity.
