= Journal of Beckett Studies =

- Discipline: Literature
- Language: English

Publication details
- History: 1976–present
- Publisher: Edinburgh University Press
- Frequency: Biannual

Standard abbreviations
- ISO 4: J. Beckett Stud.

Indexing
- ISSN: 0309-5207 (print); 1759-7811 (web)

Links
- Journal homepage

The Journal of Beckett Studies publishes academic articles relating to the work of Samuel Beckett, (1906–1989), the Irish poet, dramatist and playwright. Published twice yearly by Edinburgh University Press in April and September, it was established in 1976, under the editorship of John Pilling and James Knowlson. It was edited from 1989 by Stan Gontarski and is now edited by Mark Nixon (University of Reading) and Dirk Van Hulle (University of Antwerp).

Each issue contains an introduction, essays or notes, review essays and reviews of books and performances. The journal alternates between themed issues overseen by guest editors, and general issues.
