= Samuel Beckett =

Irish writer (1906–1989)

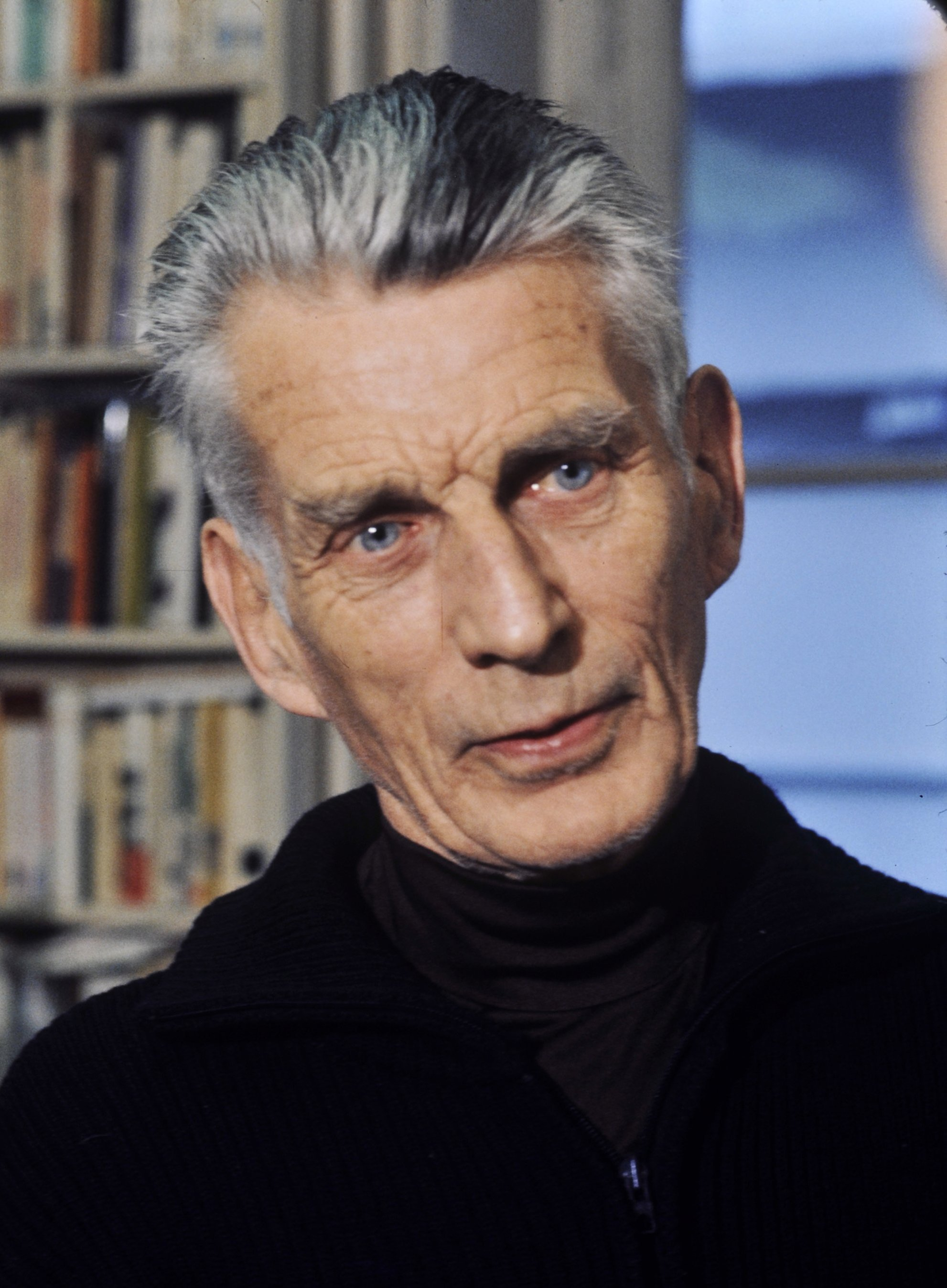
- Beckett in 1977
- Born: Samuel Barclay Beckett; 13 April 1906; Dublin, Ireland
- Died: 22 December 1989 (aged 83); Paris, France
- Resting place: Cimetière du Montparnasse
- Education: Trinity College Dublin (BA)
- Occupations: Playwright; novelist; poet
- Spouse: Suzanne Dechevaux-Dumesnil (m. 1961; died 1989)
- Writing career
- Language: English; French
- Notable works: Murphy (1938); Molloy (1951); Malone Dies (1951); Waiting for Godot (1952); The Unnamable (1953); Endgame (1957); Krapp's Last Tape (1958); Happy Days (1961)
- Notable awards: Prix International (1961); Nobel Prize in Literature (1969)

Samuel Barclay Beckett (/ˈbɛkɪt/; 13 April 1906 – 22 December 1989) was an Irish playwright, novelist, and poet. Written in both English and French, his literary and theatrical works feature bleak, impersonal, and tragicomic episodes of life, coupled with black comedy and literary nonsense. As a key proponent of Irish literature, he is best known for his tragicomedy play Waiting for Godot (1953), and is widely regarded as one of the most influential and important writers of the 20th century, credited with transforming modern theatre. For his foundational contribution to both literature and theatre, Beckett received the 1969 Nobel Prize in Literature, "for his writing, which—in new forms for the novel and drama—in the destitution of modern man acquires its elevation."

During his early career, Beckett worked as a literary critic and commentator, and in 1930 he took up a role as a lecturer in Dublin. He wrote his first novel Dream of Fair to Middling Women in 1932, but it was not published until after his death. Around this time, Beckett also began studying artistic expressions and art history, particularly of paintings displayed at the National Gallery of Ireland. He was a close friend of the Irish writer James Joyce, and cited him as a major inspiration for his works. As a resident of Paris for most of his adult life, Beckett wrote in both French and English, sometimes under the pseudonym Andrew Belis. His later literary works, especially his plays, became increasingly austere and minimalistic as his career progressed, involving more aesthetic and linguistic experimentation, with techniques of stream of consciousness, repetition and self-reference. During the Second World War, Beckett became a member of the French Resistance group Gloria SMH (Réseau Gloria) and was awarded the Croix de Guerre in 1945.

His works were well received by critics and theatre audiences during his own lifetime, and his career spanned both Ireland and France, with short stints in Germany and Italy. During these terms, Beckett collaborated with many leading actors, actresses and theatre directors for his plays. Beckett's works are known for their existential themes, and these made them an important part of 20th-century plays and dramas. In 1961, he shared the inaugural Prix International with Jorge Luis Borges. He was also the first Saoi of the Aosdána, having been elected to the position in 1984.

Beckett is considered to be one of the last modernist writers and a key figure in what Martin Esslin called the "Theatre of the Absurd." He died in 1989 and was buried at the Cimetière du Montparnasse. He posthumously became one of the most prized and widely discussed Irish authors, and several landmarks have been named in his honour, with the most notable being the Samuel Beckett Bridge in Dublin. His best-known play, Waiting for Godot, has since become a centrepiece of modernist literature, and in a public poll by London's Royal National Theatre in 1998, it was voted as "the most significant English-language play of the 20th century."

== Early life ==
Samuel Barclay Beckett was born on 13 April 1906 in Foxrock, a suburb of Dublin, to William Frank Beckett (1871–1933), a quantity surveyor of French Huguenot descent, and Maria Jones Roe, an Irish nurse. His parents were both 35 when he was born, and had married in 1901. Beckett had one elder brother named Frank Edward (1902–1954). At the age of five, he attended a local playschool in Dublin, where he started to learn music, and then moved to Earlsfort House School near Harcourt Street in Dublin. The Becketts were members of the Church of Ireland; raised as an Anglican, Beckett later became agnostic, a perspective which informed his writing.

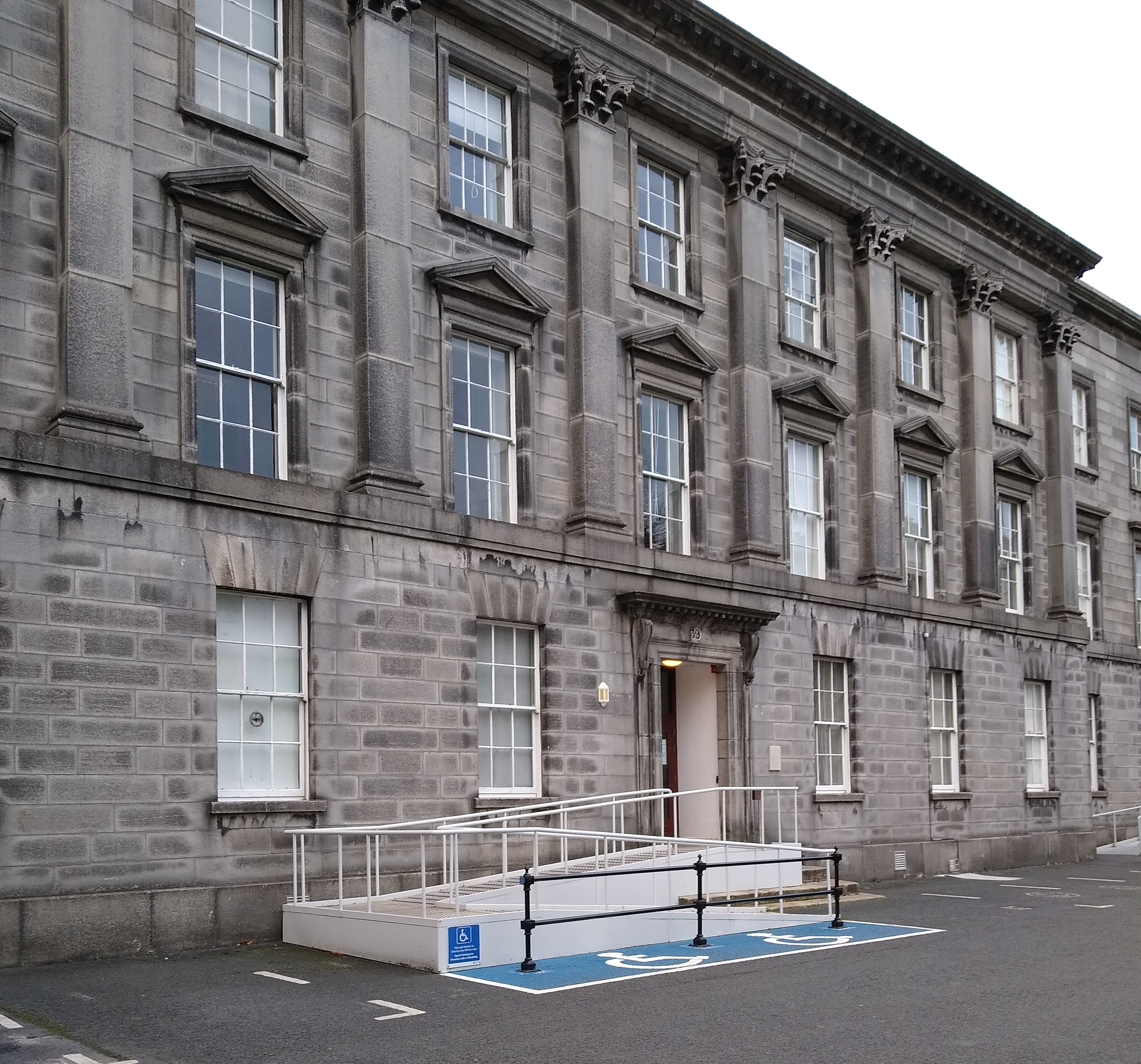
Beckett's residence at Trinity College Dublin, pictured in 2021

Beckett's family home, Cooldrinagh, was a large house and garden complete with a tennis court built in 1903 by Beckett's father. The house and garden, its surrounding countryside where he often went walking with his father, the nearby Leopardstown Racecourse, the Foxrock railway station, and Harcourt Street station would all feature in his prose and plays.

Around 1919 or 1920, he went to Portora Royal School in Enniskillen, which Oscar Wilde had also attended. He left in 1923 and entered Trinity College Dublin, where he studied modern literature and Romance languages, and received his bachelor's degree in 1927. A natural athlete, he excelled at cricket as a left-handed batsman and a left-arm medium-pace bowler. Later, he played for Dublin University and played two first-class games against Northamptonshire. As a result, he became the only Nobel literature laureate to have played first-class cricket and thus to appear in Wisden.

== Early writings ==
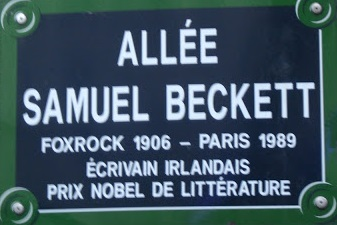
Samuel Beckett Walk in Paris

Beckett studied French, Italian, and English at Trinity College Dublin from 1923 to 1927 (one of his tutors – not a teaching role in TCD – was the Berkeley scholar A. A. Luce, who introduced him to the work of Henri Bergson). He was elected a Scholar in Modern Languages in 1926. Beckett graduated with a BA and, after teaching briefly at Campbell College in Belfast, took up the post of lecteur d'anglais at the École Normale Supérieure in Paris from November 1928 to 1930. While there, he was introduced to Irish author James Joyce by Thomas MacGreevy, a poet and close confidant of Beckett who also worked there. This meeting had a profound effect on the young man. Beckett assisted Joyce in various ways, one of which was research towards the book that became Finnegans Wake.

In 1929, Beckett published his first work, a critical essay titled "Dante... Bruno. Vico.. Joyce". The essay defends Joyce's work and method, chiefly from allegations of wanton obscurity and dimness, and was Beckett's contribution to Our Exagmination Round His Factification for Incamination of Work in Progress (a book of essays on Joyce which also included contributions by Eugene Jolas, Robert McAlmon, and William Carlos Williams). Beckett's close relationship with Joyce and his family cooled, however, when he rejected the advances of Joyce's daughter Lucia. Beckett's first short story, "Assumption", was published in Jolas's periodical transition. The next year he won a small literary prize for his hastily composed poem "Whoroscope", which draws on a biography of René Descartes that Beckett happened to be reading when he was encouraged to submit.

In 1930, Beckett returned to Trinity College as a lecturer. In November 1930, he presented a paper in French to the Modern Languages Society of Trinity on the Toulouse poet Jean du Chas, founder of a movement called le Concentrisme. It was a literary parody, for Beckett had in fact invented the poet and his movement that claimed to be "at odds with all that is clear and distinct in Descartes". Beckett later insisted that he had not intended to fool his audience. When Beckett resigned from Trinity at the end of 1931, his brief academic career was at an end. He commemorated it with the poem "Gnome", which was inspired by his reading of Johann Wolfgang Goethe's Wilhelm Meister's Apprenticeship and eventually published in The Dublin Magazine in 1934:

Spend the years of learning squandering
Courage for the years of wandering
Through a world politely turning
From the loutishness of learning

Beckett travelled throughout Europe. He spent some time in London, where in 1931 he published Proust, his critical study of French author Marcel Proust. Two years later, following his father's death, he began two years' treatment with Tavistock Clinic psychoanalyst Dr. Wilfred Bion. Aspects of it became evident in Beckett's later works, such as Watt and Waiting for Godot. In 1932, he wrote his first novel, Dream of Fair to Middling Women, but after many rejections from publishers decided to abandon it (it was eventually published in 1992). Despite his inability to get it published, however, the novel served as a source for many of Beckett's early poems, as well as for his first full-length book, the 1933 short-story collection More Pricks Than Kicks.

Beckett published essays and reviews, including "Recent Irish Poetry" (in The Bookman, August 1934) and "Humanistic Quietism", a review of his friend Thomas MacGreevy's Poems (in The Dublin Magazine, July–September 1934). They focused on the work of MacGreevy, Brian Coffey, Denis Devlin and Blanaid Salkeld, despite their slender achievements at the time, comparing them favourably with their Celtic Revival contemporaries and invoking Ezra Pound, T. S. Eliot, and the French symbolists as their precursors. In describing these poets as forming "the nucleus of a living poetic in Ireland", Beckett was tracing the outlines of an Irish poetic modernist canon.

In 1935 – the year that he successfully published a book of his poetry, Echo's Bones and Other Precipitates – Beckett worked on his novel Murphy. In May, he wrote to MacGreevy that he had been reading about film and wished to go to Moscow to study with Sergei Eisenstein at the Gerasimov Institute of Cinematography. In mid-1936 he wrote to Eisenstein and Vsevolod Pudovkin to offer himself as their apprentice. Nothing came of this, however, as Beckett's letter was lost owing to Eisenstein's quarantine during the smallpox outbreak, as well as his focus on a script re-write of his postponed film production. In 1936, a friend had suggested he look up the works of Arnold Geulincx, which Beckett did and he took many notes. The philosopher's name is mentioned in Murphy and the reading apparently left a strong impression. Murphy was finished in 1936 and Beckett departed for extensive travel around Germany, during which time he filled several notebooks with lists of noteworthy artwork that he had seen and noted his distaste for the Nazi savagery that was overtaking the country. Returning to Ireland briefly in 1937, he oversaw the publication of Murphy (1938), which he translated into French the following year. He fell out with his mother, which contributed to his decision to settle permanently in Paris. Beckett remained in Paris following the outbreak of World War II in 1939, preferring, in his own words, "France at war to Ireland at peace". His was soon a known face in and around Left Bank cafés, where he strengthened his allegiance with Joyce and forged new ones with artists Alberto Giacometti and Marcel Duchamp, with whom he regularly played chess. Sometime around December 1937, Beckett had a brief affair with Peggy Guggenheim, who nicknamed him "Oblomov" (after the character in Ivan Goncharov's novel).

In January 1938 in Paris, Beckett was stabbed in the chest and nearly killed when he refused the solicitations of a notorious pimp (who went by the name of Prudent). Joyce arranged a private room for Beckett at the hospital. The publicity surrounding the stabbing attracted the attention of Suzanne Dechevaux-Dumesnil, who knew Beckett slightly from his first stay in Paris. This time, however, the two would begin a lifelong companionship. At a preliminary hearing, Beckett asked his attacker for the motive behind the stabbing. Prudent replied: "Je ne sais pas, Monsieur. Je m'excuse" ["I do not know, sir. I apologise"]. Beckett eventually dropped the charges against his attacker – partially to avoid further formalities, partly because he found Prudent likeable and well-mannered. After his own near-fatal stabbing in 2022, author Salman Rushdie referenced Beckett's example when talking about his reasons for not interviewing his attacker.

For Beckett, the 1930s was a decade of artistic exploration. He started to take a serious interest in art history, frequenting Ireland's National Gallery, studying a range of painters and movements (specifically the Dutch Golden Age), and even visiting private collections. In 1933 Beckett applied for the position of assistant curator at London's National Gallery. Later, in the winter of 1936–37, having sailed from Cobh in East Cork to Hamburg on 26 September 1936, he took a deep dive into Germany's galleries and underground collections. This lasting engagement with the visual arts seeped into his creative process, often shaping his literary output and incentivising him to collaborate with artists such as Joan Mitchell and Geneviève Asse.

== World War II and French Resistance ==
After the German occupation of France in 1940, Beckett joined the French Resistance, working as a courier for the Réseau Gloria network. On several occasions over the next two years he was nearly caught by the Gestapo. In August 1942, his network was betrayed and he and Suzanne fled south on foot to the safety of the small village of Roussillon, Vaucluse. During the two years that Beckett stayed in Roussillon he indirectly helped the Maquis engage in sabotage operations against German occupational forces in the Vaucluse mountains, though Beckett rarely spoke about his wartime work in later life. He was awarded the Croix de Guerre on 30 March 1945, and later the Médaille de la Reconnaissance Française, by the French government for his efforts in fighting the German occupation; to the end of his life, however, Beckett would refer to his work with the French Resistance as "boy scout stuff".

While in hiding in Roussillon, Beckett continued work on the novel Watt. He started the novel in 1941 and completed it in 1945, but it was not published until 1953; however, an extract had appeared in the Dublin literary periodical Envoy. After the war, he returned to France in 1946 where he worked as a stores manager at the Irish Red Cross Hospital based in Saint-Lô. Beckett described his experiences in an untransmitted radio script, "The Capital of the Ruins".

== Fame: novels and the theatre ==
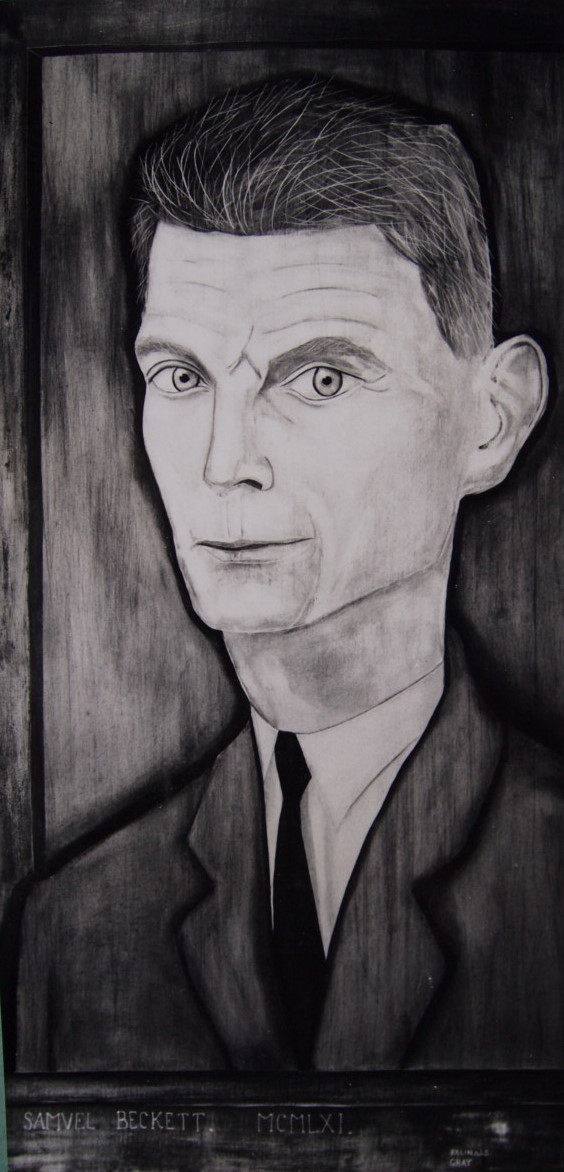
Portrait of Samuel Beckett by Reginald Gray, painted in Paris, 1961 (from the collection of Ken White, Dublin)

In 1945, Beckett returned to Dublin for a brief visit. During his stay, he had a revelation in his mother's room: his entire future direction in literature appeared to him. Beckett had felt that he would remain forever in the shadow of Joyce, certain to never beat him at his own game. His revelation prompted him to change direction and acknowledge both his own stupidity and his interest in ignorance and impotence:

"I realised that Joyce had gone as far as one could in the direction of knowing more, [being] in control of one's material. He was always adding to it; you only have to look at his proofs to see that. I realised that my own way was in impoverishment, in lack of knowledge and in taking away, in subtracting rather than in adding."

Knowlson argues that "Beckett was rejecting the Joycean principle that knowing more was a way of creatively understanding the world and controlling it ... In future, his work would focus on poverty, failure, exile and loss – as he put it, on man as a 'non-knower' and as a 'non-can-er.'" The revelation "has rightly been regarded as a pivotal moment in his entire career". Beckett fictionalised the experience in his play Krapp's Last Tape (1958). While listening to a tape he made earlier in his life, Krapp hears his younger self say "clear to me at last that the dark I have always struggled to keep under is in reality my most...", at which point Krapp fast-forwards the tape (before the audience can hear the complete revelation). Beckett later explained to Knowlson that the missing words on the tape are "precious ally".

In 1946, Jean-Paul Sartre's magazine Les Temps modernes published the first part of Beckett's short story "Suite" (later to be called "La Fin", or "The End"), not realising that Beckett had only submitted the first half of the story; co-editor Simone de Beauvoir refused to publish the second part. Beckett also began to write his fourth novel, Mercier et Camier, which was not published until 1970. The novel preceded his most famous work, the play En attendant Godot (Waiting for Godot), which was written not long afterwards. More importantly, Mercier and Camier was Beckett's first long work written in French, the language of most of his subsequent works which were strongly supported by Jérôme Lindon, director of his Parisian publishing house Les Éditions de Minuit, including the poioumenon "trilogy" of novels: Molloy (1951); Malone meurt (1951), Malone Dies (1958); L'innommable (1953), The Unnamable (1960). Despite being a native English speaker, Beckett wrote in French because, as he himself claimed, it was easier for him thus to write "without style".

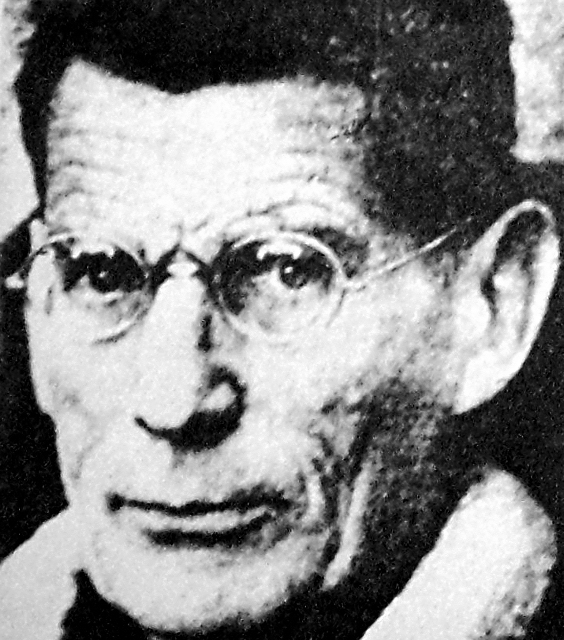
Portrait, circa 1970

Waiting for Godot, like most of his works after 1947, was first written in French. Beckett worked on the play between October 1948 and January 1949. His partner, Suzanne Dechevaux-Dumesnil, was integral to its success. Dechevaux-Dumesnil became his agent and sent the manuscript to multiple producers until they met Roger Blin, the soon-to-be director of the play.

Blin's knowledge of French theatre and vision, alongside Beckett's knowing what he wanted the play to represent, contributed greatly to its success. In a much-quoted article, the critic Vivian Mercier wrote that Beckett "has achieved a theoretical impossibility—a play in which nothing happens, that yet keeps audiences glued to their seats. What's more, since the second act is a subtly different reprise of the first, he has written a play in which nothing happens, twice." The play was published in 1952 and premièred in 1953 in Paris; an English translation was performed two years later. The play was a critical, popular, and controversial success in Paris. It opened in London in 1955 to mainly negative reviews, but the tide turned with positive reactions from Harold Hobson in The Sunday Times and, later, Kenneth Tynan. After the showing in Miami, the play became extremely popular, with highly successful performances in the US and Germany. The play is a favourite: it is not only performed frequently but has globally inspired playwrights to emulate it. This is the sole play the manuscript of which Beckett never sold, donated or gave away. He refused to allow the play to be translated into film but did allow it to be played on television.

During this time in the 1950s, Beckett became one of several adults who sometimes drove local children to school; one such child was André Roussimoff, who later became a famous professional wrestler under the name André the Giant. They had a surprising amount of common ground and bonded over their love of cricket, with Roussimoff later recalling that the two rarely talked about anything else. Beckett translated all of his works into English himself, with the exception of Molloy, for which he collaborated with Patrick Bowles. The success of Waiting for Godot opened up a career in theatre for its author. Beckett went on to write successful full-length plays, including Fin de partie (Endgame) (1957), Krapp's Last Tape (1958, written in English), Happy Days (1961, also written in English), and Play (1963). In 1961, Beckett received the International Publishers' Formentor Prize in recognition of his work, which he shared that year with Jorge Luis Borges.

== Later life and death ==
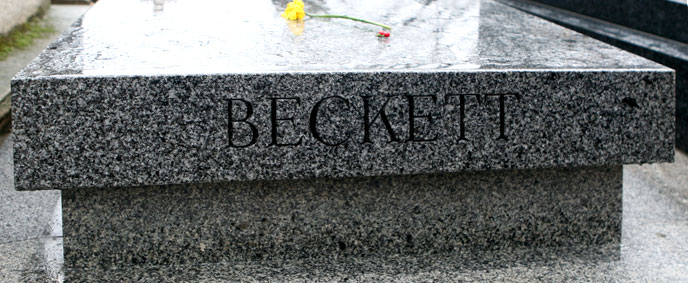
Tomb of Samuel Beckett at the cimetière du Montparnasse

The 1960s were a time of change for Beckett, both on a personal level and as a writer. In 1961, he married Suzanne in a secret civil ceremony in England (its secrecy due to reasons relating to French inheritance law). The success of his plays led to invitations to attend rehearsals and productions around the world, leading eventually to a new career as a theatre director. In 1957, he had his first commission from the BBC Third Programme for a radio play, All That Fall. He continued writing sporadically for radio and extended his scope to include cinema and television. He began to write in English again, although he also wrote in French until the end of his life. He bought some land in 1953 near a hamlet about 60 kilometres (40 mi) northeast of Paris and built a cottage for himself with the help of some locals.

From the late 1950s until his death, Beckett had a relationship with Barbara Bray, a widow who worked as a script editor for the BBC. Knowlson wrote of them: "She was small and attractive, but, above all, keenly intelligent and well-read. Beckett seems to have been immediately attracted by her and she to him. Their encounter was highly significant for them both, for it represented the beginning of a relationship that was to last, in parallel with that with Suzanne, for the rest of his life." Bray died in Edinburgh on 25 February 2010.

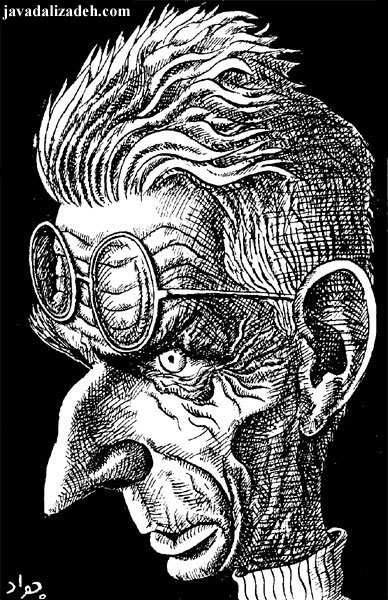
Caricature of Samuel Beckett by Javad Alizadeh

In 1969 the avant-garde filmmaker Rosa von Praunheim shot an experimental short film portrait about Beckett, which he named after the writer.

In October 1969 while on holiday in Tunis with Suzanne, Beckett heard that he had won the 1969 Nobel Prize in Literature. Anticipating that her intensely private husband would be saddled with fame from that moment on, Suzanne called the award a "catastrophe". While Beckett did not devote much time to interviews, he sometimes met the artists, scholars, and admirers who sought him out in the anonymous lobby of the Hotel PLM Saint-Jacques in Paris – where he arranged his appointments and often had lunch – near his Montparnasse home. Although Beckett was an intensely private man, a review of the second volume of his letters by Roy Foster on 15 December 2011 issue of The New Republic reveals Beckett to be not only unexpectedly amiable but frequently prepared to talk about his work and the process behind it.

Suzanne died on 17 July 1989. Confined to a nursing home and suffering from emphysema and possibly Parkinson's disease, Beckett died on 22 December 1989. The two were interred together in the cimetière du Montparnasse in Paris and share a simple granite gravestone that follows Beckett's directive that it should be "any colour, so long as it's grey".

== Works ==
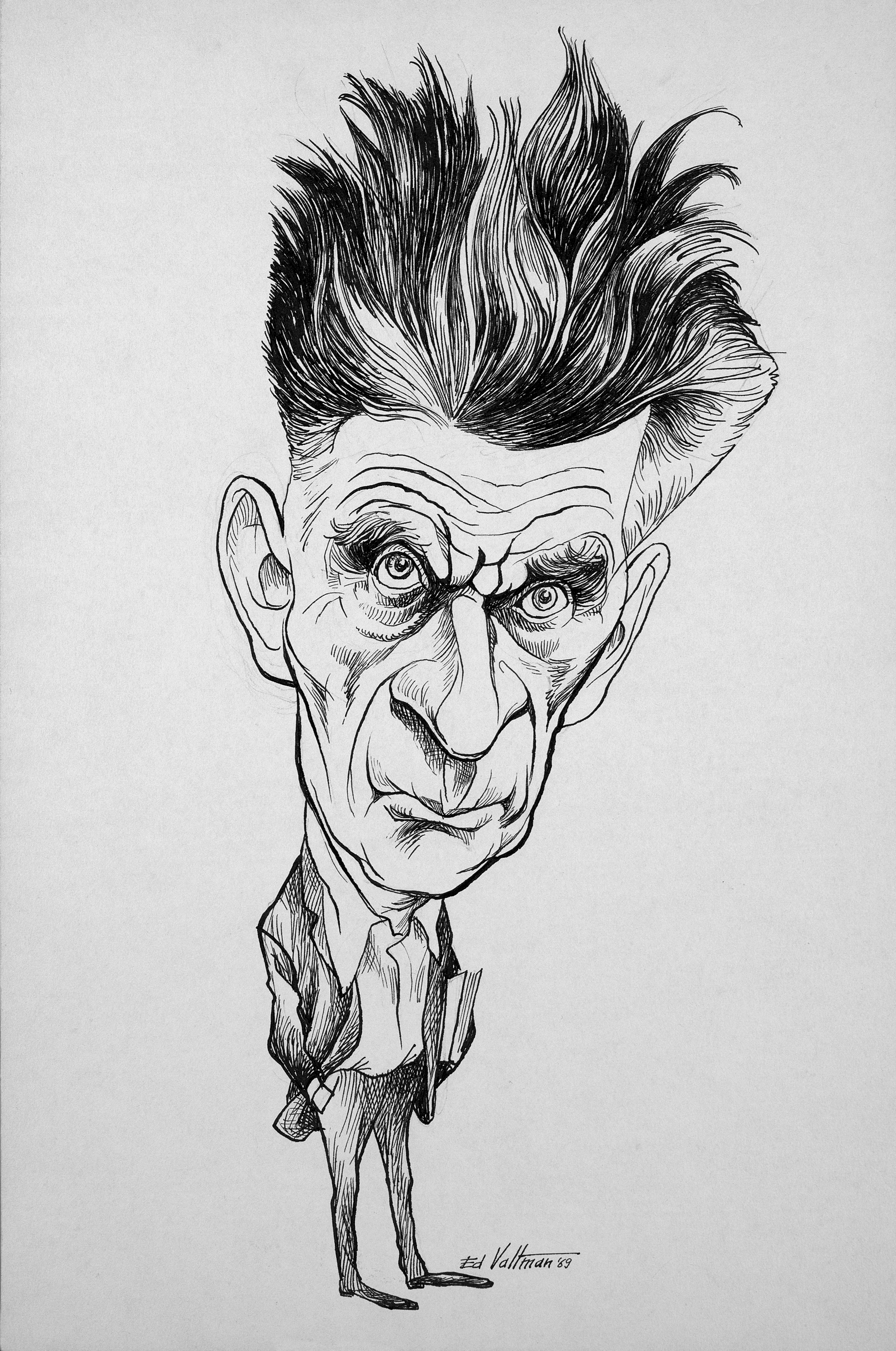
Caricature of Beckett by Edmund S. Valtman

Beckett's career as a writer can be roughly divided into three periods: his early works, up until the end of World War II in 1945; his middle period, stretching from 1945 until the early 1960s, during which he wrote what are probably his best-known works; and his late period, from the early 1960s until Beckett's death in 1989, during which his works tended to become shorter and his style more minimalist.

=== Early works ===
Beckett's earliest works are generally considered to have been strongly influenced by the work of his friend James Joyce. They are erudite and seem to display the author's learning merely for its own sake, resulting in several obscure passages. The opening phrases of the short-story collection More Pricks than Kicks (1934) afford a representative sample of this style:

It was morning and Belacqua was stuck in the first of the canti in the moon. He was so bogged that he could move neither backward nor forward. Blissful Beatrice was there, Dante also, and she explained the spots on the moon to him. She shewed him in the first place where he was at fault, then she put up her own explanation. She had it from God, therefore he could rely on its being accurate in every particular.

The passage makes reference to Dante's Commedia, which can serve to confuse readers not familiar with that work. It also anticipates aspects of Beckett's later work: the physical inactivity of the character Belacqua; the character's immersion in his own head and thoughts; the somewhat irreverent comedy of the final sentence.

Similar elements are present in Beckett's first published novel, Murphy (1938), which also explores the themes of insanity and chess (both of which would be recurrent elements in Beckett's later works). The novel's opening sentence hints at the somewhat pessimistic undertones and black humour that animate many of Beckett's works: "The sun shone, having no alternative, on the nothing new". Watt, written while Beckett was in hiding in Roussillon during World War II, is similar in terms of themes but less exuberant in its style. It explores human movement as if it were a mathematical permutation, presaging Beckett's later preoccupation—in both his novels and dramatic works—with precise movement.

Beckett's 1930 essay Proust was strongly influenced by Schopenhauer's pessimism and laudatory descriptions of saintly asceticism. At this time Beckett began to write creatively in the French language. In the late 1930s, he wrote a number of short poems in that language and their sparseness—in contrast to the density of his English poems of roughly the same period, collected in Echo's Bones and Other Precipitates (1935)—seems to show that Beckett, albeit through the medium of another language, was in process of simplifying his style, a change also evidenced in Watt.

=== Middle period ===
who may tell the tale
of the old man?
weigh absence in a scale?
mete want with a span?
the sum assess
of the world's woes?
nothingness
in words enclose?

— From Watt (1953)

After World War II, Beckett turned definitively to the French language as a vehicle. It was this, together with the "revelation" experienced in his mother's room in Dublin—in which he realised that his art must be subjective and drawn wholly from his own inner world—that would result in the works for which Beckett is best remembered today.

During the 15 years following the war, Beckett produced four major full-length stage plays: En attendant Godot (written 1948–1949; Waiting for Godot), Fin de partie (1955–1957; Endgame), Krapp's Last Tape (1958), and Happy Days (1961). These plays—which are often considered, rightly or wrongly, to have been instrumental in the so-called "Theatre of the Absurd"—deal in a darkly humorous way with themes similar to those of the roughly contemporary existentialist thinkers. The term "Theatre of the Absurd" was coined by Martin Esslin in a book of the same name; Beckett and Godot were centrepieces of the book. Esslin argued these plays were the fulfilment of Albert Camus's concept of "the absurd"; this is one reason Beckett is often falsely labelled as an existentialist (this is based on the assumption that Camus was an existentialist, though he in fact broke off from the existentialist movement and founded his own philosophy). Though many of the themes are similar, Beckett had little affinity for existentialism as a whole.

Broadly speaking, the plays deal with the subject of despair and the will to survive in spite of that despair, in the face of an uncomprehending and incomprehensible world. The words of Nell—one of the two characters in Endgame who are trapped in ashbins, from which they occasionally peek their heads to speak—can best summarise the themes of the plays of Beckett's middle period: "Nothing is funnier than unhappiness, I grant you that. ... Yes, yes, it's the most comical thing in the world. And we laugh, we laugh, with a will, in the beginning. But it's always the same thing. Yes, it's like the funny story we have heard too often, we still find it funny, but we don't laugh any more."

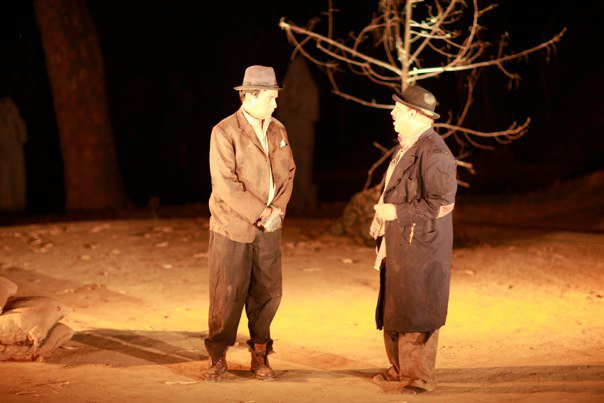
Beckett's Waiting for Godot is considered a hallmark of the Theatre of the Absurd. The play's two protagonists, Vladimir and Estragon (pictured, in a 2010 production at The Doon School, India), give voice to Beckett's existentialism.

Beckett's outstanding achievements in prose during the period were the three novels Molloy (1951), Malone meurt (1951; Malone Dies) and L'innommable (1953: The Unnamable). In these novels—sometimes referred to as a "trilogy", though this is against the author's own explicit wishes—the prose becomes increasingly bare and stripped down. Molloy, for instance, still retains many of the characteristics of a conventional novel (time, place, movement, and plot) and it makes use of the structure of a detective novel. In Malone Dies, movement and plot are largely dispensed with, though there is still some indication of place and the passage of time; the "action" of the book takes the form of an interior monologue. Finally, in The Unnamable, almost all sense of place and time are abolished, and the essential theme seems to be the conflict between the voice's drive to continue speaking so as to continue existing, and its almost equally strong urge towards silence and oblivion. Despite the widely held view that Beckett's work, as exemplified by the novels of this period, is essentially pessimistic, the will to live seems to win out in the end; witness, for instance, the famous final phrase of The Unnamable: "you must go on, I can't go on, I'll go on".

After these three novels, Beckett struggled for many years to produce a sustained work of prose, a struggle evidenced by the brief "stories" later collected as Texts for Nothing. In the late 1950s, however, he created one of his most radical prose works, Comment c'est (1961; How It Is). An early variant version of Comment c'est, L'Image, was published in the British arts review, X: A Quarterly Review (1959), and is the first appearance of the novel in any form. This work relates the adventures of an unnamed narrator crawling through the mud while dragging a sack of canned food. It was written as a sequence of unpunctuated paragraphs in a style approaching telegraphese: "You are there somewhere alive somewhere vast stretch of time then it's over you are there no more alive no more than again you are there again alive again it wasn't over an error you begin again all over more or less in the same place or in another as when another image above in the light you come to in hospital in the dark". Following this work, it was almost another decade before Beckett produced a work of non-dramatic prose. How It Is is generally considered to mark the end of his middle period as a writer.

=== Late works ===
time she stopped
sitting at her window
quiet at her window
only window
facing other windows
other only windows
all eyes
all sides
high and low
time she stopped

— From Rockaby (1980)

Throughout the 1960s and into the 1970s, Beckett's works exhibited an increasing tendency—already evident in much of his work of the 1950s—towards compactness. This has led to his work sometimes being described as minimalist. The extreme example of this, among his dramatic works, is the 1969 piece Breath, which lasts for only 35 seconds and has no characters (though it was likely intended to offer ironic comment on Oh! Calcutta!, the theatrical revue for which it served as an introductory piece).

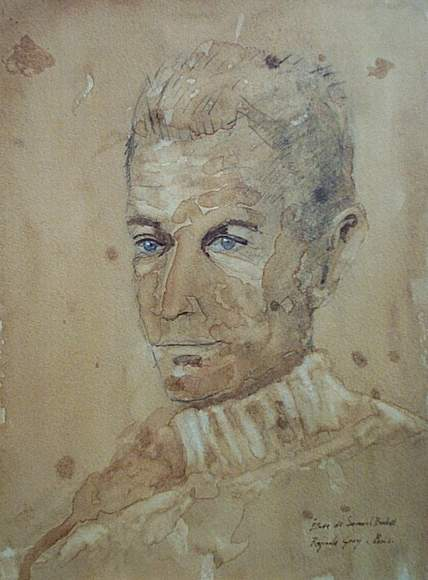
Portrait by Reginald Gray

In his theatre of the late period, Beckett's characters—already few in number in the earlier plays—are whittled down to essential elements. The ironically titled Play (1962), for instance, consists of three characters immersed up to their necks in large funeral urns. The television drama Eh Joe (1963), which was written for the actor Jack MacGowran, is animated by a camera that steadily closes into a tight focus upon the face of the title character. The play Not I (1972) consists almost solely of, in Beckett's words, "a moving mouth with the rest of the stage in darkness". Following from Krapp's Last Tape, many of these later plays explore memory, often in the form of a forced recollection of haunting past events in a moment of stillness in the present. They also deal with the theme of the self-confined and observed, with a voice that either comes from outside into the protagonist's head (as in Eh Joe) or else another character comments on the protagonist silently, by means of gesture (as in Not I). Beckett's most politically charged play, Catastrophe (1982), which was dedicated to Václav Havel, deals relatively explicitly with the idea of dictatorship. After a long period of inactivity, Beckett's poetry experienced a revival during this period in the ultra-terse French poems of mirlitonnades, with some as short as six words. These defied Beckett's usual scrupulous concern to translate his work from its original into the other of his two languages; several writers, including Derek Mahon, have attempted translations, but no complete version of the sequence has been published in English.

Beckett's late style saw him experiment with technology to create increasingly transdisciplinary works. This sampling of a range of artistic mediums and styles – classical music, painting, sculpture, television, and literature – to create a new and original form, or genre, is evident in his television plays. In works like Ghost Trio (broadcast in 1977) and Nacht und Träume (broadcast in 1983) Beckett uses a musical frame (taking excerpts from Beethoven and Schubert, respectively) to structure his text and borrows well-known images from art history to create evocative stills that suggest themes of longing, ambiguity, hope, and suffering. Such experimentation with genre, music, and the visual arts, characterises Beckett's work during the 1970s and '80s.

Beckett's prose pieces during the late period were not as prolific as his theatre, as suggested by the title of the 1976 collection of short prose texts Fizzles (which the American artist Jasper Johns illustrated). Beckett experienced something of a renaissance with the novella Company (1980), which continued with Ill Seen Ill Said (1982) and Worstward Ho (1983), later collected in Nohow On. In these three "'closed space' stories," Beckett continued his pre-occupation with memory and its effect on the confined and observed self, as well as with the positioning of bodies in space, as the opening phrases of Company make clear: "A voice comes to one in the dark. Imagine." "To one on his back in the dark. This he can tell by the pressure on his hind parts and by how the dark changes when he shuts his eyes and again when he opens them again. Only a small part of what is said can be verified. As for example when he hears, You are on your back in the dark. Then he must acknowledge the truth of what is said." Themes of aloneness and the doomed desire to successfully connect with other human beings are expressed in several late pieces, including Company and Rockaby.

In the hospital and nursing home where he spent his final days, Beckett wrote his last work, the 1988 poem "What is the Word" ("Comment dire"). During this time, Beckett suffered from Aphasia, a condition that caused a decline in his ability to speak and understand language. The poem grapples with an inability to find words to express oneself, a theme echoing Beckett's earlier work, though possibly amplified by the sickness he experienced late in life.

== Collaborators ==
=== Jack MacGowran ===
Jack MacGowran was the first actor to perform a one-man show based on the works of Beckett. He debuted End of Day in Dublin in 1962, revising it as Beginning To End (1965). The show went through further revisions before Beckett directed it in Paris in 1970; MacGowran won the 1970–1971 Obie for Best Performance By an Actor when he performed the show off-Broadway as Jack MacGowran in the Works of Samuel Beckett. Beckett wrote the radio play Embers and the teleplay Eh Joe specifically for MacGowran. The actor also appeared in various productions of Waiting for Godot and Endgame, and did several readings of Beckett's plays and poems on BBC Radio; he also recorded the LP MacGowran Speaking Beckett for Claddagh Records in 1966.

=== Billie Whitelaw ===
Billie Whitelaw worked with Beckett for 25 years on such plays as Not I, Eh Joe, Footfalls and Rockaby. She first met Beckett in 1963. In her autobiography Billie Whitelaw... Who He?, she describes their first meeting in 1963 as "trust at first sight". Beckett went on to write many of his experimental theatre works for her. She came to be regarded as his muse, the "supreme interpreter of his work", perhaps most famous for her role as the mouth in Not I. She said of the play Rockaby: "I put the tape in my head. And I sort of look in a particular way, but not at the audience. Sometimes as a director, Beckett comes out with absolute gems and I use them a lot in other areas. We were doing Happy Days and I just did not know where in the theatre to look during this particular section. And I asked, and he thought for a bit and then said, 'Inward' ". She said of her role in Footfalls: "I felt like a moving, musical Edvard Munch painting and, in fact, when Beckett was directing Footfalls he was not only using me to play the notes but I almost felt that he did have the paintbrush out and was painting." "Sam knew that I would turn myself inside out to give him what he wanted", she explained. "With all of Sam's work, the scream was there, my task was to try to get it out." She stopped performing his plays in 1989 when he died.

=== Jocelyn Herbert ===
The English stage designer Jocelyn Herbert was a close friend and influence on Beckett until his death. She worked with him on such plays as Happy Days (their third project) and Krapp's Last Tape at the Royal Court Theatre. Beckett said that Herbert became his closest friend in England: "She has a great feeling for the work and is very sensitive and doesn't want to bang the nail on the head. Generally speaking, there is a tendency on the part of designers to overstate, and this has never been the case with Jocelyn."

=== Walter Asmus ===
The German director Walter D. Asmus began his working relationship with Beckett in the Schiller Theatre in Berlin in 1974 and continued until 1989, the year of the playwright's death. Asmus has directed many of Beckett's plays internationally.

== Legacy ==
Samuel Beckett depicted on an Irish commemorative coin celebrating the 100th anniversary of his birth

Of all the English-language modernists, Beckett's work represents the most sustained attack on the realist tradition. He opened up the possibility of theatre and fiction that dispense with conventional plot and the unities of time and place to focus on essential components of the human condition. Václav Havel, John Banville, Aidan Higgins, Tom Stoppard, Harold Pinter and Jon Fosse have publicly stated their indebtedness to Beckett's example. He has had a wider influence on experimental writing since the 1950s, from the Beat Generation to the happenings of the 1960s and after. In an Irish context, he has exerted great influence on poets such as Derek Mahon and Thomas Kinsella, as well as writers like Trevor Joyce and Catherine Walsh who proclaim their adherence to the modernist tradition as an alternative to the dominant realist mainstream.

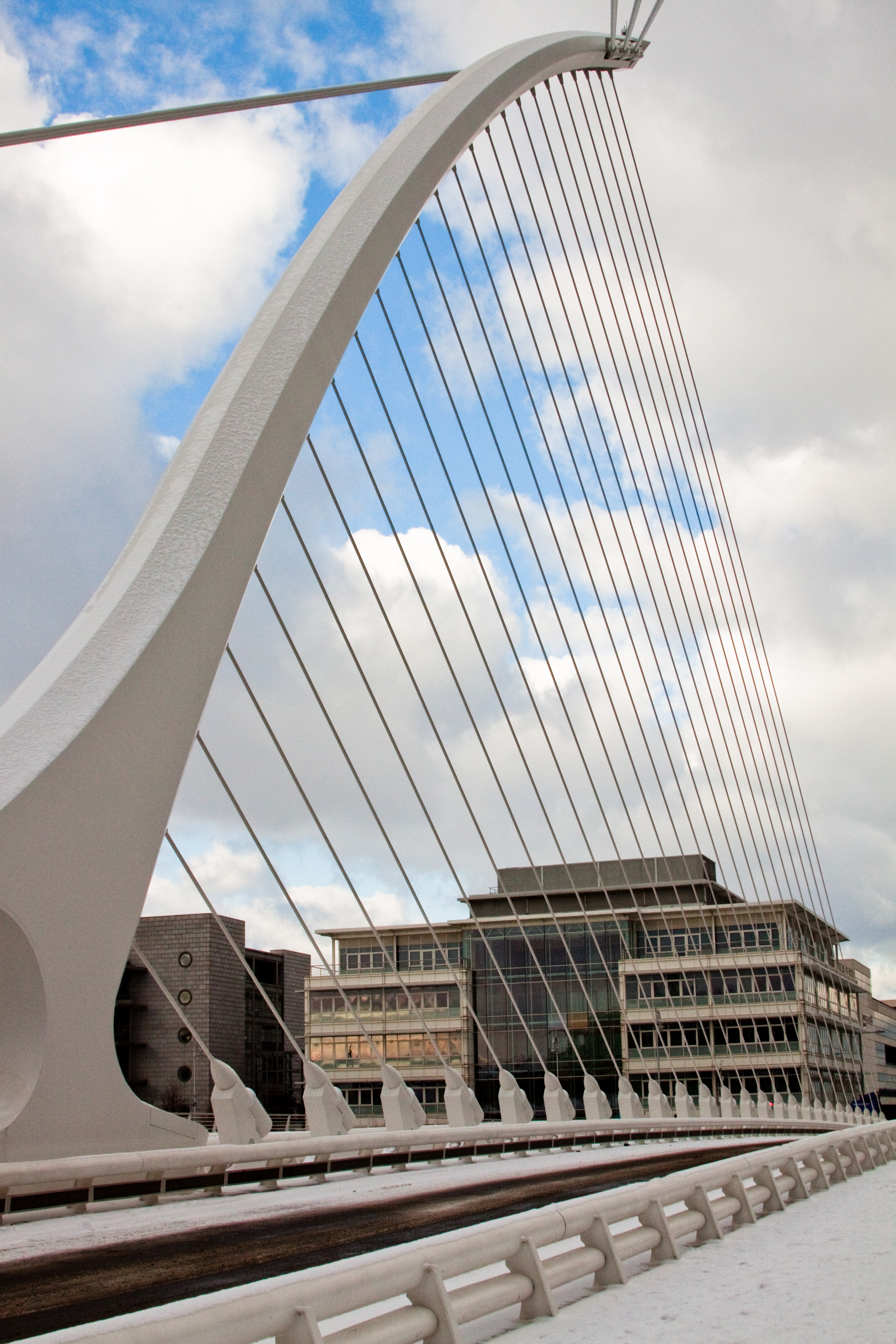
The Samuel Beckett Bridge, Dublin

Many major 20th-century composers including Luciano Berio, György Kurtág, Morton Feldman, Pascal Dusapin, Philip Glass, Roman Haubenstock-Ramati and Heinz Holliger have created musical works based on Beckett's texts. His work has also influenced numerous international writers, artists and filmmakers including Edward Albee, Sam Shepard, Avigdor Arikha, Paul Auster, J. M. Coetzee, Richard Kalich, Douglas Gordon, Bruce Nauman, Anthony Minghella, Damian Pettigrew, Charlie Kaufman and Brian Patrick Butler.

Beckett is one of the most influential, widely discussed, and highly prized of 20th-century authors, inspiring a critical industry to rival that which has sprung up around James Joyce. He has divided critical opinion. Some early philosophical critics, such as Sartre and Theodor Adorno, praised him, one for his revelation of absurdity, the other for his works' critical refusal of simplicities; others such as Georg Lukács condemned him for 'decadent' lack of realism.

Since Beckett's death, all rights for the performance of his plays are handled by the Beckett estate, currently managed by Edward Beckett (the author's nephew). The estate has a controversial reputation for maintaining firm control over how Beckett's plays are performed and does not grant licences to productions that do not adhere to the writer's stage directions.

Historians interested in tracing Beckett's bloodline were, in 2004, granted access to confirmed trace samples of his DNA to conduct molecular genealogical studies to facilitate precise lineage determination.

Some of the best-known pictures of Beckett were taken by photographer John Minihan, who photographed him between 1980 and 1985 and developed such a good relationship with the writer that he became, in effect, his official photographer. Some consider one of these to be among the top three photographs of the 20th century. It was the theatre photographer, John Haynes, however, who took possibly the most widely reproduced image of Beckett: it is used on the cover of the Knowlson biography, for instance. This portrait was taken during rehearsals of the San Quentin Drama Workshop at the Royal Court Theatre in London, where Haynes photographed many productions of Beckett's work. An Post, the Irish postal service, issued a commemorative stamp of Beckett in 1994. The Central Bank of Ireland launched two Samuel Beckett Centenary commemorative coins on 26 April 2006: €10 Silver Coin and €20 Gold Coin.

On 10 December 2009, the new bridge across the River Liffey in Dublin was opened and named the Samuel Beckett Bridge in his honour. Reminiscent of a harp on its side, it was designed by the celebrated Spanish architect Santiago Calatrava, who had also designed the James Joyce Bridge situated further upstream and opened on Bloomsday (16 June) 2003. Attendees at the official opening ceremony included Beckett's niece Caroline Murphy, his nephew Edward Beckett, poet Seamus Heaney and Barry McGovern. A ship of the Irish Naval Service, the LÉ Samuel Beckett (P61), is named for Beckett. An Ulster History Circle blue plaque in his memory is located at Portora Royal School, Enniskillen, County Fermanagh.

In La Ferté-sous-Jouarre, the town where Beckett had a cottage, the public library and one of the local high schools bear his name.

Happy Days Enniskillen International Beckett Festival is an annual multi-arts festival celebrating the work and influence of Beckett. The festival, founded in 2011, is held at Enniskillen, Northern Ireland where Beckett spent his formative years studying at Portora Royal School.

In 1983, the Samuel Beckett Award was established for writers who, in the opinion of a committee of critics, producers and publishers, showed innovation and excellence in writing for the performing arts. In 2003, The Oxford Samuel Beckett Theatre Trust was formed to support the showcasing of new innovative theatre at the Barbican Centre in the City of London.

Music for three Samuel Beckett plays (Words and Music, Cascando, and ...but the clouds...), was composed by Martin Pearlman which was commissioned by the 92nd Street Y in New York for the Beckett centennial and produced there and at Harvard University.

In 2022 James Marsh directed a biopic of Beckett written by Neil Forsyth and entitled Dance First, with Gabriel Byrne and Fionn O'Shea playing Beckett at different stages of his life. The film was made available through Sky Cinema in 2023.

== Archives ==
Samuel Beckett's prolific career is spread across archives around the world. Significant collections include those at the Harry Ransom Center, Washington University in St. Louis, the University of Reading, Trinity College Dublin, and Houghton Library. Given the scattered nature of these collections, an effort has been made to create a digital repository through the University of Antwerp.

== Honours and awards ==
- Croix de Guerre (30 March 1945)
- Médaille de la Reconnaissance Française
- 1959 honorary doctorate from Trinity College Dublin
- 1961 International Publishers' Formentor Prize (shared with Jorge Luis Borges)
- 1968 Foreign Honorary Member of the American Academy of Arts and Sciences
- 1969 Nobel Prize in Literature
- Saoi of Aosdana (Ireland)
- 2016 The house that Beckett lived at in 1934 (48 Paultons Square, Chelsea, London) received an English Heritage Blue Plaque
- Obies (for Off-Broadway plays):
  - 1958: Endgame
  - 1960: Krapp's Last Tape
  - 1962: Happy Days
  - 1964: Play

== Selected works by Beckett ==
=== Dramatic works ===
Theatre

- Human Wishes (c. 1936; published 1984)
- Eleutheria (written 1947 in French; published in French 1995, and English 1996)
- En attendant Godot (published 1952, performed 1953) (Waiting for Godot, pub. 1954, perf. 1955)
- Acte sans Paroles I (1956); Act Without Words I (1957)
- Acte sans Paroles II (1956); Act Without Words II (1957)
- Fin de partie (published 1957); Endgame (published 1957)
- Krapp's Last Tape (first performed 1958)
- Fragment de théâtre I (late 1950s); Rough for Theatre I
- Fragment de théâtre II (late 1950s); Rough for Theatre II
- Happy Days (first performed 1961); Oh les beaux jours (published 1963)
- Play (performed in German, as Spiel, 1963; English version 1964)
- Come and Go (first performed in German, then English, 1966)
- Breath (first performed 1969)
- Not I (first performed 1972)
- That Time (first performed 1976)
- Footfalls (first performed 1976)
- Neither (1977) (An "opera", music by Morton Feldman)
- A Piece of Monologue (first performed 1979)
- Rockaby (first performed 1981)
- Ohio Impromptu (first performed 1981)
- Catastrophe (Catastrophe et autres dramatiques, first performed 1982)
- What Where (first performed 1983)

Radio

- All That Fall (broadcast 1957)
- From an Abandoned Work (broadcast 1957)
- Embers (broadcast 1959)
- Rough for Radio I (published 1976) (written in French in 1961 as Esquisse radiophonique)
- Rough for Radio II (published 1976) (written in French in 1961 as Pochade radiophonique)
- Words and Music (broadcast 1962)
- Cascando (broadcast:1963 French version; 1964 English translation)

Television

- Eh Joe with Jack MacGowran (broadcast 1966)
- Beginning To End with Jack MacGowran (1965)
- Ghost Trio (broadcast 1977)
- ... but the clouds ... (broadcast 1977)
- Quad I + II (broadcast 1981)
- Nacht und Träume (broadcast 1983); Night and Dreams, published 1984
- Beckett Directs Beckett (1988–92)

Cinema

- Film (1965)

=== Prose ===
The Trilogy

1. Molloy (1951); English version (1955)
2. Malone meurt (1951); Malone Dies (1956)
3. L'Innommable (1953); The Unnamable (1958)

Novels

- Dream of Fair to Middling Women (written 1932; published 1992)
- Murphy (1938); 1947 Beckett's French version
- Watt (1943); 1968, Beckett's French version
- Comment c'est (1961); How It Is (1964)
- Mercier and Camier (written 1946, published 1970); English translation (1974)

Short prose

- More Pricks Than Kicks (1934)
- "Echo's Bones" (written 1933, published 2014)
- "L'Expulsé", written 1946, in Nouvelles et Textes pour rien (1955); "The Expelled" Stories and Texts for Nothing (1967)
- "Le Calmant", written 1946, in Nouvelles et Textes pour rien (1955); "The Calmative", Stories and Texts for Nothing (1967)
- "La Fin", written 1946, partially published in Les Temps Modernes in 1946 as "Suite"; in Nouvelles et Textes pour rien (1955); "The End", Stories and Texts for Nothing (1967)
- "Texts for Nothing", translated into French for Nouvelles et Textes pour rien (1955); Stories and Texts for Nothing (1967)
- "L'Image" (1959) a fragment from Comment c'est
- "Premier Amour" (1970, written 1946); translated by Beckett as "First Love", 1973
- Le Dépeupleur (1970); The Lost Ones (1971)
- Pour finir encore et autres foirades (1976); For to End Yet Again and Other Fizzles (1976)
- Company (1980)
- Mal vu mal dit (1981); Ill Seen Ill Said (1982)
- Worstward Ho (1983)
- "Stirrings Still" (1988)
- "As the Story was Told" (1990)
- The Complete Short Prose: 1929–1989, ed S. E. Gontarski. New York: Grove Press, 1995

Non-fiction

- "Dante...Bruno. Vico..Joyce" (1929; Beckett's contribution to the collection Our Exagmination Round His Factification for Incamination of Work in Progress)
- Proust (1931)
- Three Dialogues (with Georges Duthuit and Jacques Putnam) (1949)
- Disjecta: Miscellaneous Writings and a Dramatic Fragment (1929–1967)

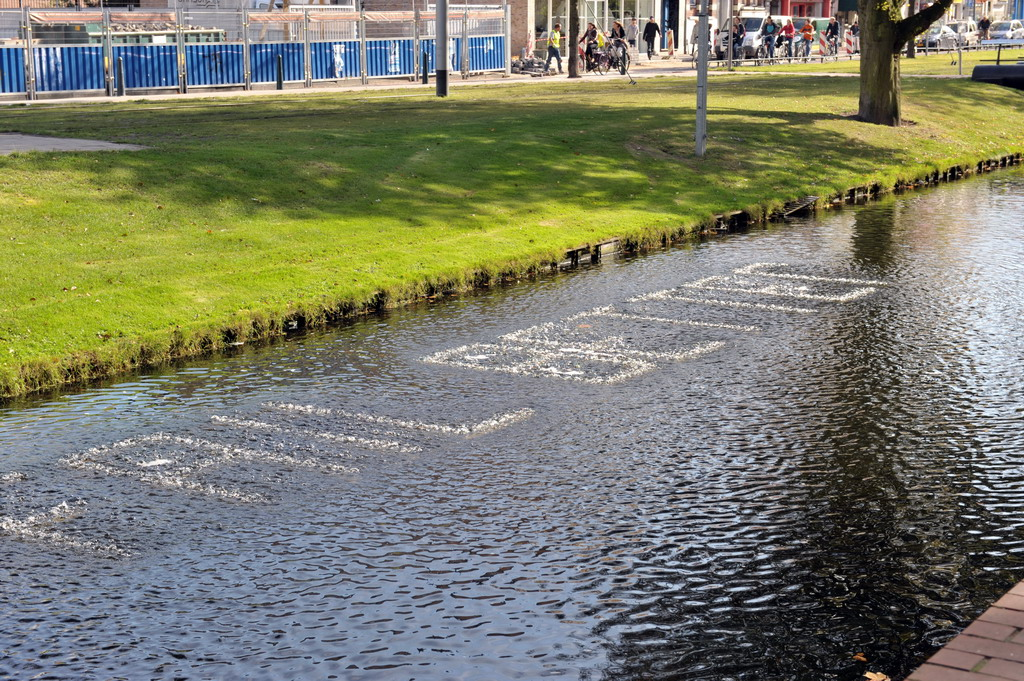
By Job Koelewijn (Amsterdam 1962) The text No Matter. Try Again. Fail Again. Fail Better by Samuel Beckett is projected onto the water surface from below on the Westersingel, Rotterdam, The Netherlands, 2001.

German Diaries:28 September 1936-1 April 1937. edited by Mark Nixon & Oliver Lubrich; translated by Gaby Hartel; Suhrkamp Verlag(2011) (Note: This is the complete diaries (translated from the original German), some 1,352 pages, published by Suhrkamp in 2026; different from the earlier book with a similar title, Nixon, Mark (2011). Samuel Beckett's German Diaries:1936-1937. Historicizing Modernism. London: Bloomsbury Publishing. ISBN 9781441152589.) hh

=== Poetry collections ===
- Whoroscope (1930)
- Echo's Bones and other Precipitates (1935)
- Poèmes (1968, expanded 1976, 1979, 1992) migrationid:060807crbo_books| Search : The New Yorker
- Poems in English (1961)
- Collected Poems in English and French (1977)
- What is the Word (1989)
- Selected Poems 1930–1989 (2009)
- The Collected Poems of Samuel Beckett, edited, annotated by Seán Lawlor, John Pilling (2012, Faber and Faber, 2014, Grove Press)

=== Translations ===
- "Anna Livia Plurabelle" into French (James Joyce, from Finnegans Wake) (1931)
- selections from Negro: an Anthology into English (Nancy Cunard, translations into English) (1934)
- Anthology of Mexican Poems into English (Octavio Paz, editor) (1958)
- The Old Tune into English (Robert Pinget) (1963)
- selections from What Is Surrealism? Selected Essays into English (André Breton) (1978)

== See also ==
- List of Irish Nobel laureates and nominees
