= Malone Dies =

Novel by Samuel Beckett

- First edition (French)
- Author: Samuel Beckett
- Original title: Malone Meurt
- Translator: Samuel Beckett
- Language: French
- Series: The Trilogy #2
- Publisher: Les Éditions de Minuit
- Publication date: 1951
- Publication place: France
- English publication date: 1956
- Preceded by: Molloy
- Followed by: The Unnamable

Malone Dies is a novel by Samuel Beckett. It was first published in 1951, in French, as Malone meurt, and later translated into English by the author.

Malone Dies contains the famous line, "Nothing is more real than nothing" – a metatextual echo of Democritus's "Naught is more real than nothing", which is referenced in Beckett's first published novel, Murphy (1938).

== As part of the Trilogy ==
Written immediately after the completion of Molloy, and finished in the summer of 1948, Malone Dies is the second novel in Beckett's "Trilogy." Like Molloy, Malone Dies furthers Beckett’s project to "empty the novel of its usual recognizable objects—plot, situation, characters—and yet to keep the reader interested and moved." Lacking much of Molloy's trace linearity or characteristic humor, with Malone Dies "we can hardly be sure of much more than that Malone, whoever he is, is dying and at the end is dead; the rest is nightmare." As Gabriel Josipovici observes, whereas Molloy/Moran reflects on the past to write memoir, Malone will write "only of what is happening to him. If necessary, to pass the time, he will tell a few stories, but the anecdotes will only be aspects of the present." In fact, Malone’s habit of beginning but then interrupting or abandoning his stories not only demonstrates the faulty fiction-making capacity of the mind, but reveals "its impotence as an instrument towards fulfillment." Confined to bed, Malone's predicament reflects the Trilogy’s progressive restriction of locomotor freedom and the shift from an outer to an inner search, not only for meaning, but for "a final letting go, a dying which is more than the cessation of breathing."

== Plot summary ==
Malone is an old man who lies naked in bed in either asylum or hospital—he is not sure which. Most of his personal effects have been taken from him, though he has retained some: his exercise book, brimless hat, and pencil. He alternates between writing on his own situation and on that of a boy named Sapo. When he reaches the point in the story where Sapo becomes a man, he changes Sapo's name to Macmann, finding Sapo a ludicrous name. Soon after, Malone admits to having killed six men, but seems to think it's not a big deal, particularly the last: a total stranger whom he cut across the neck with a razor.

Eventually, Macmann falls over in mud and is taken to an institution called St. John's of God. There he is provided with an attendant nurse: an elderly, thick-lipped woman named Moll, with crosses of bone on either ear representing the two thieves crucified with Jesus on Good Friday, and a crucifix carved on her tooth representing Jesus. The two eventually begin a stumbling sexual affair, but after a while she does not return, and he learns that she has died.

The new nurse is a man named Lemuel, and there is an animosity between the two. Macmann (and sometimes Malone drifts into the first-person) has an issue with a stick that he uses to reach things, then Lemuel takes it away.

At the end of the novel, Lemuel is assigned to take his group of five inmates on a trip to a nearby island on the charitable dime of a Lady Pedal. His five inmates are Macmann and four others. They are described by Malone thus: a young man, the Saxon ("though he was far from being any such thing"), a small and thin man with an umbrella, and a "misshapen giant, bearded." Lemuel requests "excursion soup" (the regularly served broth but with a piece of fat bacon to support the constitution) from the chef at the institution, though after receiving the soup he sucks each piece of bacon of its juice and fat before depositing it back into the soup. Lemuel takes his group onto the terrace where they are greeted by a waggonette driven by a coachman and Lady Pedal, along with two colossi in sailor suits named Ernest and Maurice.

They leave the grounds of St. John's and take a boat to the island to picnic and see Druid remains. Lady Pedal tells Maurice to stay by the dinghy while she and Ernest disembark the boat to look for a picnicking site. The bearded giant refuses to leave the boat, leaving no room for the Saxon to get off in turn. When Lady Pedal and Ernest are out of sight, Lemuel kills Maurice from behind with a hatchet. Ernest comes back for them and Lemuel kills him, too, to the delight of the Saxon. When Lady Pedal sees this, she faints, falls, and breaks a bone in the process. Malone as narrator is not sure which bone, though he ventures Lady Pedal broke her hip. Lemuel makes the others get back in the boat. It is now night and the six float far out into the bay. The novel closes with an image of Lemuel holding his bloodied hatchet up. Malone writes that Lemuel will not hit anyone with it or anything else anymore, while the final sentence breaks into semantically open-ended fragments:

Lemuel is in charge, he raises his hatchet on which the blood will never dry, but not to hit anyone, he will not hit anyone, he will not hit anyone any more, he will not touch anyone any more, either with it or with it or with it or with or

or with it or with his hammer or with his stick or with his fist or in thought in dream I mean never he will never

or with his pencil or with his stick or

or light light I mean

never there he will never

never anything

there

any more

— Beckett, Malone Dies

The majority of the book's text, however, is observational and deals with the minutiae of Malone's existence in his cell, such as dropping his pencil or his dwindling amount of writing lead. Thoughts of riding down the stairs in his bed, philosophical observations, and conjectures constitute large blocks of text and are written as tangential to the story that Malone is set on telling. Several times he refers to a list of previous Beckett protagonists: Murphy, Mercier and Camier, Molloy, and Moran.

== BBC broadcast ==
A reading of selected passages from Malone Dies was broadcast on the BBC Third Programme on 18 June 1958, with repeats on 19 June and 15 October 1958. Beckett selected the passages, which were read by the actor Patrick Magee, and incidental music, scored for harmonica, two mandolins, tuba, cello and double bass, was composed by Samuel Beckett's cousin John S. Beckett. The programme was produced by Donald McWhinnie.
