= Watt (novel) =

Novel by Samuel Beckett

- 1953 Olympia Press edition
- Author: Samuel Beckett
- Language: English
- Publisher: Olympia Press
- Publication date: 1953
- Publication place: France

Watt was Samuel Beckett's second published novel in English. It was largely written on the run in the South of France during the Second World War and was first published by Maurice Girodias's Olympia Press in 1953.

== Gestation ==
In the summer of 1945, Beckett gave the manuscript of Watt to his friend Leslie Daiken, in the hope that Daiken could find a publisher for it, but he failed to do so. In 1950, an extract was published in the Dublin literary review Envoy. The work was finally published by Maurice Girodias's Olympia Press in 1953.

A French translation followed in 1968. This was translated by Beckett in collaboration with Ludovic and Agnès Janvier.

== Contents ==
Narrated in four parts, the novel describes Watt's journey to, and within, Mr Knott's house, where he becomes the reclusive owner's manservant, replacing Arsene, who delivers a long valedictory monologue at the end of section one. In section two Watt struggles to make sense of life at Mr Knott's house, experiencing deep anxiety at the visit of the piano tuning Galls, father and son, and a mysteriously language-resistant pot, among other incidents. In section three, which has a narrator called Sam, Watt is in confinement, his language garbled almost beyond recognition, while the narrative veers off on fantastical tangents such as the story of Ernest Louit's account, to a committee at Beckett's old university, Trinity College, Dublin, of a research trip in the West of Ireland. The shorter fourth section shows Watt arriving at the railway station from which, in the novel's skewed chronology, he sets out on a journey to the institution he has already reached in section three.

The novel concludes with a series of addenda, whose incorporation into the text "only fatigue and disgust" have prevented, but which should nevertheless be "carefully studied". These take the form of concepts and fragments apparently intended for the novel but not used.

== Themes and context ==
who may tell the tale
of the old man?
weigh absence in a scale?
mete want with a span?
the sum assess
of the world's woes?
nothingness
in words enclose?

— From Watt (1953)

The character of Ernest Louit is only one of many satirical digs at Ireland contained in the novel. Others include the recognisably south Dublin locale and respectable citizenry of the novel's opening, Dum Spiro, editor of the Catholic magazine Crux and a connoisseur of obscure theological conundrums, and Beckett's exasperation at the ban on contraception in the Irish Free State (as previously remarked on in his 1935 essay "Censorship in the Saorstat").

Watt is characterised by an almost hypnotic use of repetition, extreme deadpan philosophical humour, deliberately unidiomatic English such as Watt's "facultative" tram stop, and such items as a frogs' chorus, a notated mixed choir, and heavy use of ellipsis towards the end of the text. The final words of the novel are "no symbols where none intended".

Beckett himself said that Watt was written in Roussillon as "just an exercise" while he was waiting for the war to end.

The manuscript has been described by S. E. Gontarski (in The Grove Companion to Samuel Beckett, 2004) as "the white whale of Beckett studies, a mass of documentation that defies attempts to make sense of it."

Beckett was dissatisfied with the novel as originally published, spotting "over eighty spelling and typographical errors" as well as the omission of an entire sentence on page 19. A corrected text edited by C. J. Ackerley was published by Faber and Faber in 2009. Ackerley removed many errors that appeared in previous editions.
