= Ross Lipman =

- Known for: filmmaker and restorationist
- Website: corpusfluxus.org

Ross Lipman is an American restorationist, independent filmmaker, and essayist. He is best known for his 2015 documentary Notfilm, as well as his work with the Bruce Conner Family Trust and as Senior Film Restorationist at the UCLA Film & Television Archive.

Lipman was the 2008 recipient of Anthology Film Archives' Preservation Honors, and is a three-time winner of the National Society of Film Critics' Heritage Award.

Lipman's essays on film history, technology, and aesthetics have been published in Artforum, Sight and Sound, and in numerous academic books and journals. His films have been screened internationally and have been collected by museums and archives.

His 2015 feature-length documentary Notfilm about Samuel Beckett's Film was produced and distributed by Milestone Films and premiered at the BFI London Film Festival. The documentary was prompted by the discovery of long-missing footage from the original production of Film, which Lipman discovered amid reels of outtakes in the apartment of Grove Press publisher and Film producer, Barney Rosset.

== Publications ==
Lipman has contributed numerous essays on the theory of film restoration, particularly the ethics involved in restoring independent and experimental film, beginning with “Problems of Independent Film Preservation” in 1996 and consolidated in “The Gray Zone: A Restorationist’s Travel Guide” in 2009.

Lipman's ideas have been controversial in acknowledging a subjectivity inherent in the process of restoration itself, a position once considered taboo from art conservation orthodoxy, but gaining increasing credence in recent years as museum conservators have been confronted with the transient nature of many post-war and contemporary artworks.

Lipman is also the author of several historical analytical essays, including a definitive history of John Cassavetes and his collaboration with Charles Mingus on the score for Shadows, as well as an analysis of the ground-breaking production techniques used in Kent Mackenzie's The Exiles (1961).

== Filmmaking and Performance Essays ==
Ross Lipman's early works span across a multiplicity of forms. Of his films, Doug Cummings of LA Weekly wrote, "Lipman's repertoire often highlights unique social groups with whom he has lived", and his earlier films frequently explore themes of cultural decay and renewal.

Lipman's performance essays are often concerned with the intersection of cinema history and lived experience. His best known performance is The Book of Paradise Has No Author, which premiered August 2011 at the Inquiry Towards the Practice of Secular Magic, a cross-disciplinary event at piXel (+) freQuency, hosted by Los Angeles Filmforum and presented by the Disembodied Theater Corporation. The piece explores notions of "first encounters" with lost cultures, viewed through the prism of the Tasaday tribe, who were, according to a 1972 episode of 20/20, a primitive tribe that had only recently encountered contemporary civilization.

The performance essay The Exploding Digital Inevitable premiered at International Film Festival Rotterdam in January 2017. The essay concerns the process of restoring Bruce Conner's classic avant-garde short Crossroads, for which several versions existed.

== Restoration ==
Lipman was mentored by and worked under Robert Gitt, a well-known UCLA Film & Television Archive restorationist who restored or supervised the restoration of over 360 films. Lipman adapted and developed methods of applying these principles to the restoration of independent and experimental film, where the primary concept is that moving image restoration is a form of interdisciplinary art practice that differs from other visual art forms in its production for mass duplication. Lipman has theorized and elaborated on this concept in numerous publications.

=== Restored Narrative Films ===
- Spring Night, Summer Night (1967) - J.L. Anderson
- Brandy in the Wilderness (1969) - Stanton Kaye
- Bless Their Little Hearts (1984) - Billy Woodberry
- Wanda (1970) - Barbara Loden
- The Connection (1961) - Shirley Clarke
- The Exiles (1961) - Kent Mackenzie
- Come Back to the Five and Dime, Jimmy Dean, Jimmy Dean (1982) - Robert Altman
- A Woman Under the Influence (1974) - John Cassavetes
- Faces (1968) - John Cassavetes
- Shadows (1959) - John Cassavetes
- Matewan (1987) - John Sayles
- Lianna (1981) - John Sayles
- Return of the Secaucus Seven (1979) - John Sayles
- Killer of Sheep (1977) - Charles Burnett
- The Horse (1973) - Charles Burnett
- Several Friends (1969) - Charles Burnett
- Please! Don't Bury Me Alive! (1977) - Efrain Gutierrez
- Tillie's Punctured Romance (1914) - Mack Sennett
- The Juniper Tree (1990) - Nietzchka Keene
- The Man Without a World (1991) - Eleanor Antin

=== Restored Experimental Films ===
- A Movie (1958) - Bruce Conner
- Crossroads (1976) - Bruce Conner
- Diary of an African Nun (1977) - Julie Dash
- Four Women (1975) - Julie Dash
- Love Objects & Other Short films (1969-1971) - Tom Chomont
- Film (1964) - Samuel Beckett & Alan Schneider
- Rabbit's Moon (1971) - Kenneth Anger
- Kustom Kar Kommandos (1965) - Kenneth Anger
- Scorpio Rising (1963) - Kenneth Anger
- Fireworks (1947) - Kenneth Anger
- Stop Cloning Around (1980) - Sid Laverents
- Multiple Sidosis (1970) - Sid Laverents
- One Man Band (1964) - Sid Laverents
- It Sudses and Sudses and Sudses (1962) - Sid Laverents
- Dawn to Dawn (1933) - Josef Berne
- Reel (1973) - Derek Boshier

=== Restored Documentary Films ===
- Hoop Dreams (1994) - Steve James
- Eadweard Muybridge, Zoopraxographer (1975) - Thom Andersen
- Ornette: Made in America (1984) - Shirley Clarke
- The Sid Saga (Parts 1-3) (1985-89) - Sid Laverents
- Word is Out: Stories of Some of Our Lives (1978) - Peter Adair
- The Times of Harvey Milk (1984) - Rob Epstein
- Sunday (1961) - Dan Drasin
- La Onda Chicana (1977) - Efrain Gutierrez
- In the Year of the Pig (1968) - Emile de Antonio
- Point of Order! (1964) - Emile de Antonio
- USA Poetry: Allen Ginsberg (1965/75) - WNET
- USA Poetry: Anne Sexton (1965/75) - WNET
- São Paulo de Ontem, São Paulo de Hoje (1943) - Anonymous
- Native Land (1942) - Leo Hurwitz, Paul Strand
- It's All True (1941) - Orson Welles
- Tri pesni o Lenine (Three Songs of Lenin) (1938) - Dziga Vertov

== Filmography ==
- The Case of the Vanishing Gods (2021)
- In the Middle of the Nights: From Arthouse to Grindhouse and Back Again (2020)
- Between Two Cinemas (2018)
- Billy and Charles (2018)
- Notfilm (2015)
- Keep Warm, Burn Britain!
- Personal Ethnographies (2007–2013)
  - Dr. Bish Remedies
  - Afternoon in Bottle Village
  - Clean MRF / Dirty MRF
  - Transmissions From The Link
  - At the Dolores
  - Nora Keyes in the Ghost City
  - Claire's Dream
  - Self-portrait in Mausoleum
  - Death Valley Story
- The Perfect Heart of Flux (2007–2013)
  - Ocean Beach / Point Lobos I, II, III.
  - Afternoon in Bottle Village
  - Clean MRF / Dirty MRF
  - Curva Peligrosa
  - Casa Loma (Dignity and Impudence)
  - Tracy, California
  - Cheonggye Stream Renovation
  - In The Treeless Forest
  - Self-portrait in Mausoleum
  - Found Sand Mandala
- Rhythm 06 (2008)
- The Interview (2004)
- Michael Barrish Screen Test (1997)
- Rhythm 93 (1993–94)
- Rhythm 92 (1992—93)
- Kino-i (1991)
- 10-17-88 (1989)
