= Notfilm =

- Directed by: Ross Lipman
- Written by: Ross Lipman
- Starring: Ross Lipman, Kevin Brownlow, S.E. Gontarski, James Karen, Leonard Maltin, Barney Rosset, Haskell Wexler, Billie Whitelaw
- Edited by: Ross Lipman
- Distributed by: Milestone Film & Video, Inc.
- Release date: October 17, 2015 (BFI London Film Festival)
- Running time: 130 minutes
- Country: United States
- Language: English

Notfilm is a 2015 feature-length documentary, directed by Ross Lipman on the production of playwright Samuel Beckett's only film, an experimental short titled Film starring Buster Keaton.

While conducting preliminary research to restore Film, filmmaker and restorationist Ross Lipman visited Grove Press founder and Film producer Barney Rosset at his apartment, where Lipman discovered reels of film and audio. This material contained outtakes from Beckett's 1965 production, including a prologue long-thought lost.

Notfilm reconstructs this prologue and integrates rare audio of Beckett's voice, surreptitiously recorded by Rosset, in a self-described "Kino Essay" that analyzes the philosophical foundation of Film, arguing it was an expression of Samuel Beckett's own distaste for the public eye.

== Synopsis ==
Both a traditional making-of documentary and an essayistic exploration into the philosophical implications of Samuel Beckett's Film, Notfilm outlines the circumstances leading to its production, the production process and its critical reception. Director Ross Lipman's narration outlines the philosophical foundation of Film as a rebuttal of the Irish philosopher George Berkeley’s premise that “to be is to be perceived.” Audio secretly recorded by Rosset at a production meeting leads into an examination of Beckett's own distaste for being filmed and photographed.

== Critical reception ==
Following an October 2015 world premiere at the BFI London Film Festival, Notfilm went on to screen at several other festivals, including CPH:DOX, International Film Festival Rotterdam, Dublin Film Festival, Film Comment Selects, Hong Kong International Film Festival and Docs Against Gravity.

It appeared on several Best of the Year lists, including Nicole Brenez's published in Artforum, in The New Republic and in Paste.

Notfilm was reviewed in the Los Angeles Times, Film Comment, The New Yorker, The Village Voice and Slate. In his review for The New York Times, A.O. Scott wrote "Notfilm finds a hitherto uncharted dimension of human and cinematic experience.”
