= Picnic, Lightning =

Poetry book by Billy Collins

- Author: Billy Collins
- Genre: Poetry
- Publisher: University of Pittsburgh Press
- Publication date: 1998
- Publication place: United States
- ISBN: 978-0-8229-5670-9
- Preceded by: The Art of Drowning (1995)
- Followed by: Taking Off Emily Dickinson’s Clothes (2000)

Picnic, Lightning is a collection of poetry by Billy Collins, published in 1998. His fourth book of poetry, it was his first to be widely published (selling over 50,000 copies) and his last before election as United States Poet Laureate.

The title poem is a reference to Humbert Humbert's description of his mother's death in the second chapter of Lolita by Vladimir Nabokov. "My very photogenic mother died in a freak accident (picnic, lightning) when I was three...."
