= Ruth Gruber =

American author and journalist (1911–2016)

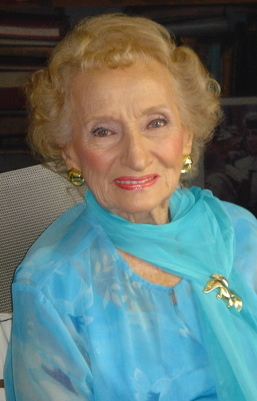
- Gruber in 2007
- Born: September 30, 1911; New York City, New York, U.S.
- Died: November 17, 2016 (aged 105); Manhattan, New York, U.S.
- Occupations: Journalist, photographer, writer, humanitarian, U.S. government official

Ruth Gruber (/ˈɡruːbər/; September 30, 1911 – November 17, 2016) was an American journalist, photographer, writer, humanitarian, and United States government official.

Born in Brooklyn to Russian Jewish immigrants, she was encouraged to pursue her dream of becoming a writer. At age 20, she received a doctorate from the University of Cologne in Germany, which was awarded for her dissertation on Virginia Woolf. In the 1930s, she established herself as a journalist writing about women under fascism and communism, traveling as far as the Soviet Arctic. She also served two years in Alaska as a field representative of the U.S. Department of the Interior. As World War II raged in Europe, she turned her attention to the crisis of Jewish refugees: acting on behalf of the Roosevelt administration, she escorted 1,000 refugees from Italy to the United States and recorded their stories. She witnessed the scene at the Port of Haifa when Holocaust survivors on the ship Exodus 1947 were refused entry to British-controlled Palestine, and she documented their deportation back to Germany.

In subsequent years, she covered the evacuation of Ethiopian Jews to Israel. She was a recipient of the Norman Mailer Prize.

== Early life ==
Ruth Gruber was born in Brooklyn, New York, one of five children of Russian Jewish immigrant parents, Gussie (Rockower) and David Gruber. She dreamed of becoming a writer and was encouraged by her parents to obtain higher education. She matriculated at New York University at the age of 15. At eighteen she won a postgraduate fellowship at the University of Wisconsin–Madison.

In 1931, she won another fellowship from the Institute of International Education to study in Germany, at the University of Cologne, where she took courses in German philosophy, modern English literature, and art history. She completed a Ph.D. in one year, with a dissertation on Virginia Woolf, becoming (at that time) the youngest person in the world to receive a doctorate.

While in Germany, Gruber witnessed Nazi rallies and after completing her studies and returning to America, she brought the awareness of the dangers of Nazism. Gruber's writing career began in 1932. In 1935, the New York Herald Tribune asked her to write a feature series about women under Fascism and Communism. While working for the Herald Tribune, she became the first foreign correspondent to fly through Siberia into the Soviet Arctic.

== Special Assistant to the Secretary of the Interior ==
During World War II, Secretary of the Interior Harold L. Ickes appointed Gruber as his Special Assistant. In this role, she carried out a study on the prospects of Alaska for homesteading G.I.s after the war. In 1944, she was assigned a secret mission to Europe to bring one thousand Jewish refugees and wounded American soldiers from Italy to the US. Ickes made her "a simulated general" so in case the military aircraft she flew in was shot down and she was caught by the Nazis, she would be kept alive according to the Geneva Convention. Throughout the voyage, the Army troop transport USNS Henry Gibbins was hunted by Nazi seaplanes and U-boats. Gruber's book Haven: The Dramatic Story of 1000 World War II Refugees and How They Came to America was based on case histories she recorded as she interviewed the refugees.

Since the U.S. Congress refused to lift the quota on Jewish immigration to the United States from Europe, President Roosevelt acted by executive authority and invited the group of one thousand to visit America. The refugees were to be guests of the president and upon arriving in New York, they were transferred to Fort Ontario Emergency Refugee Shelter, formerly a decommissioned Army training base in Oswego, New York, and locked behind a chain link fence with barbed wire. While U.S. government agencies argued about whether they should be allowed to stay or, at some point, be deported to Europe, Gruber lobbied to keep them through the end of the war. It was not until January 1946 that the decision was made to allow them to apply for American residency. This was the only attempt by the United States to shelter Jewish refugees during the war.

The Safe Haven Museum and Education Center was set up in Oswego, New York dedicated to keeping alive the stories of the 982 refugees from World War II who were allowed into the United States as "guests" of President Franklin D. Roosevelt.

== Post-war career ==
The Arab Legion post at the Allenby Bridge, 1946. Gruber was the first journalist to enter the newly established Hashemite Kingdom of Jordan

In 1946, Gruber took leave from her federal post to return to journalism. The New York Post asked her to cover the work of a newly created Anglo-American Committee of Inquiry on Palestine. The Committee was to decide the fate of 100,000 European Jewish refugees who were living in European camps as displaced persons (DP). Harry Truman pressed Great Britain to open the doors of British Mandate of Palestine. The committee members spent four months in Europe, Palestine, and the Arab countries and another month in Switzerland digesting their experiences. At the end of its deliberations, the committee's twelve members unanimously agreed that Britain should allow 100,000 Jewish immigrants to settle in Palestine. British foreign minister Ernest Bevin rejected the finding.

Eventually the issue was taken up by the recently established United Nations, which appointed a Special Committee on Palestine (UNSCOP). Gruber accompanied UNSCOP as a correspondent for the New York Herald.

=== Exodus 1947 ===
Gruber witnessed the ship Exodus entering Haifa harbor after it was intercepted by the Royal Navy while making an attempt to transport 4,500 Jews to Palestine. She proceeded to fly to Cyprus to meet with those onboard Exodus and photographed Jewish detainees in the internment camps there. 1,500 of those who had been onboard Exodus were sent by British authorities back to Port-de-Bouc, France onboard the ship Runnymede Park, though once the vessel arrived the Jews onboard refused to disembark and were eventually sent back to Germany on the same ship. Gruber was the sole journalist allowed onboard Runnymede Park during the vessel's journey from Cyprus to France, and her photographs of Exodus's voyage "were sent to thousands of newspapers and magazines, and radically transformed attitudes toward the plight of Jewish refugees and Holocaust survivors after the war."

=== Operation Magic Carpet ===
In 1949, Gruber was brought to Aden by the American Jewish Joint Distribution Committee to report on Operation Magic Carpet, the airlift of some 49,000 Yemenite Jews to the newly established state of Israel. She flew on one of the airlift's flights from Aden to Israel, aboard a plane carrying 140 Yemenite Jews, and in her dispatch described herself as "the first correspondent permitted to fly the entire airlift". Her account, published in the New York Herald Tribune in early November 1949 and reprinted days later in The Washington Post, broke the story of the operation. Produced in coordination with the Joint Distribution Committee, it prompted the committee's first public announcement of the airlift, after which the Israeli military censorship that had kept the mass movement out of the press was lifted.

=== After 1950 ===
In 1951, Gruber married Philip H. Michaels, a community leader in the South Bronx. She gave birth to two children, one of whom is former Assistant Secretary of Labor for Occupational Safety and Health David Michaels, and continued her journalistic travels. She wrote a popular column for Hadassah Magazine, "Diary of an American Housewife." Her niece is science writer Dava Sobel.

Some years after Philip Michaels' death in 1968, Gruber married longtime New York City Social Services administrator Henry J. Rosner in 1974.

In 1978, she spent a year in Israel writing Raquela: A Woman of Israel, about an Israeli nurse, Raquela Prywes, who worked in a British detention camp and in a hospital in Beersheba. This book won the National Jewish Book Award in 1979 for Best Book on Israel.

In 1985, at the age of 74, she visited isolated Jewish villages in Ethiopia and described the rescue of the Ethiopian Jews in Rescue: The Exodus of the Ethiopian Jews. Gruber received many awards for her writing and humanitarian acts, including the Na'amat Golda Meir Human Rights Award and awards from the Simon Wiesenthal Center's Museum of Tolerance.

On October 21, 2008, Gruber was honored for her work defending free expression by the National Coalition Against Censorship. In 2016, an exhibit of her photographs titled Ruth Gruber: Photojournalist was on display at the Oregon Jewish Museum in Portland.

In 2009, a documentary film on Gruber premiered at the Toronto International Film Festival. Entitled "Ahead of Time," the film was directed by Bob Richman and produced by Zeva Oelbaum and chronicled Gruber's early life and groundbreaking career until 1948.

She died at the age of 105 on November 17, 2016.

In 2011, at the age of 100, Ruth Gruber's work as a photojournalist - spanning six decades on four continents - was the subject of a retrospective exhibition at the International Center of Photography in New York. The exhibition, Ruth Gruber: Photojournalist, curated by Maya Benton, is traveling internationally through 2020. Gruber's photographs, organized chronologically, include Soviet Arctic (1935-1936); Alaska Territory (1941–43); Henry Gibbons/Oswego, New York (1944); Exodus 1947; Runnymede Park (1947); Cyprus Internment Camp (1947); Israel/Middle East (1949–51); North Africa (1951-51); Ethiopia (1985).

Gruber's first volume of her autobiography Ahead of Time: My Early Years as a Foreign Correspondent was published in 1991.

== Portrayals ==
The 2001 television film Haven is based on Gruber's life story. The film stars Natasha Richardson as Gruber and Anne Bancroft as her mother Gussie.

A documentary about Gruber's life, titled Ahead of Time, was released in 2010.

== Publications ==
- I Went to the Soviet Arctic, 1939, 1991
- I Went To The Soviet Union, 1944
- Destination Palestine: The story of the Haganah ship Exodus 1947, 1948
- Israel without tears, 1950
- Israel today: Land of many nations, 1958
- Israel on the seventh day, 1968
- Puerto Rico: island of promise
- Felisa Rincon De Gautier: The Mayor of San Juan, 1972
- Die Bauern-Passion Von Waal (coauthors: Ursula Zeidler, Gerhard Eberts), 1976
- They Came to Stay (coauthor: Marjorie Margolies-Mezvinsky), 1976
- Raquela: A Woman of Israel, 1978, 1985, 1993, 2000
- Haven: The Dramatic Story of 1000 World War II Refugees and How They Came to America, 1983, 2000
- Rescue: The Exodus of the Ethiopian Jews, 1987
- Ahead of Time: My Early Years As a Foreign Correspondent, 1991, 2001
- Exodus 1947: The Ship That Launched the Nation, 1999 (ISBN 0-8129-3154-8), 2007
- Inside of Time: My Journey from Alaska to Israel, 2002, 2004
- Virginia Woolf: The Will To Create As A Woman, 2005
- Witness: One of the Great Correspondents of the Twentieth Century Tells Her Story Schocken, 2007 (ISBN 0-8052-4243-0)
