= Norman Mailer Prize =

Defunct American literary award

The Norman Mailer Prize or Mailer Prize was an American literary award established in 2009 by the Norman Mailer Center and The Norman Mailer Writers Colony to celebrate writers and their works. Norman Mailer was a 20th-century American author. Prizes were given in the years 2009–2015, after which the Norman Mailer Center ceased its activities.

== Honorees ==
2009

- Lifetime Achievement: Toni Morrison
- Distinguished Journalism: David Halberstam

2010

- Lifetime Achievement: Orhan Pamuk
- Lifetime Achievement in Magazine Publishing: Jann Wenner
- Distinguished Journalism and Humanitarianism: Ruth Gruber

2011

- Lifetime Achievement: Elie Wiesel
- Distinguished Writing: Arundhati Roy
- Distinguished Journalism: Gay Talese
- Biography: Keith Richards, Life

2012

- Lifetime Achievement: Joyce Carol Oates
- Distinguished Publishing: Barnet Lee Rosset, Jr.
- Biography: Robert A. Caro

2013

- Lifetime Achievement: Maya Angelou
- Distinguished Writing: Junot Díaz
- Distinguished Journalism: Michael Hastings

2014

- Lifetime Achievement: Don DeLillo
- Distinguished Magazine Publishing: Katrina vanden Heuvel
- Distinguished Poetry: Billy Collins

2015

- Lifetime Achievement: Salman Rushdie
