= Raquela Prywes =

Israeli nurse

- רחלה פריבס
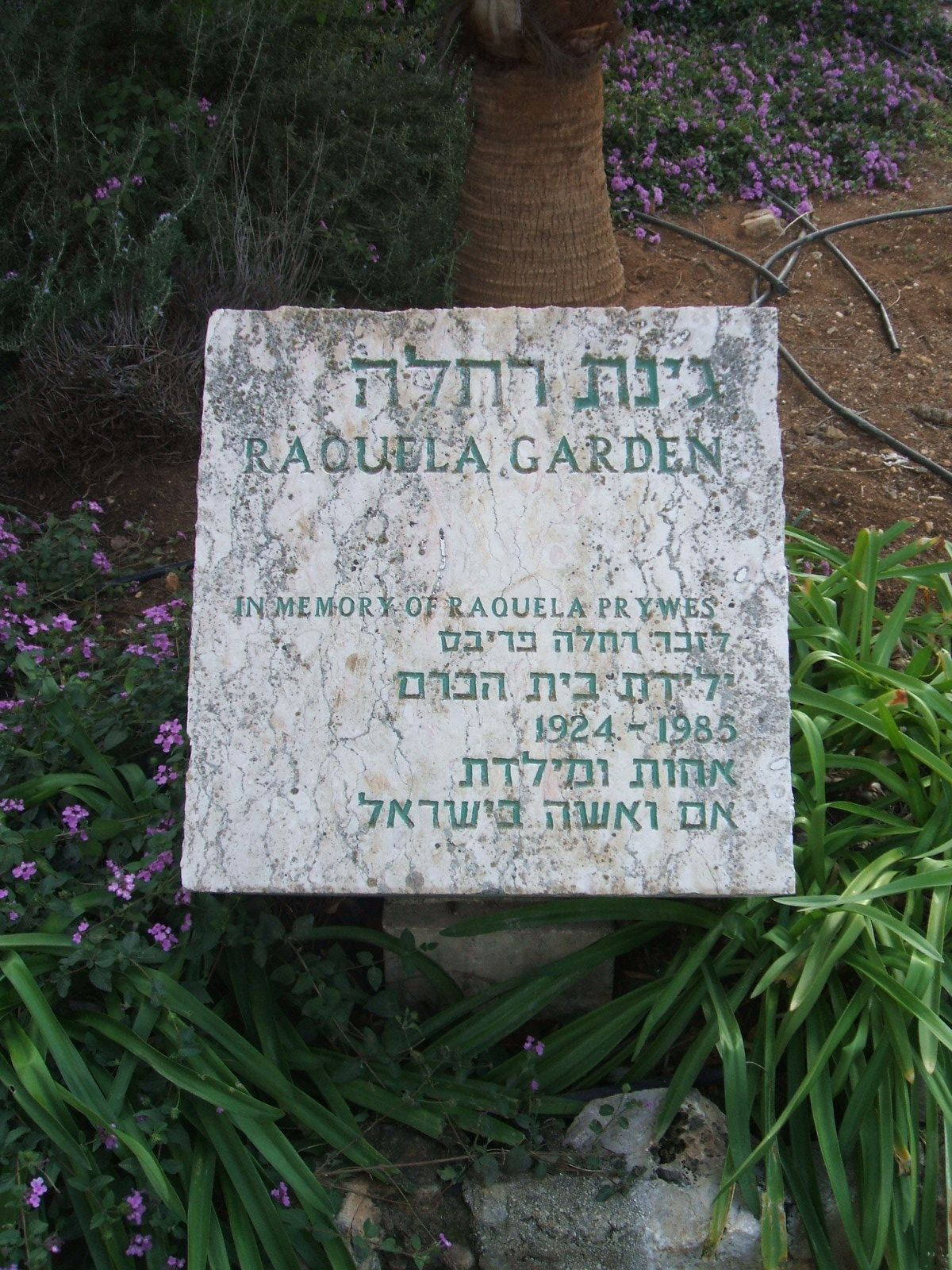
- Raquela Garden in Beit HaKerem, Jerusalem
- Born: Raquela Levy; 1924; Jerusalem, Mandatory Palestine
- Died: March 1985 (aged 60–61)
- Occupations: Nurse, midwife
- Known for: Providing maternal care in Israel and for Holocaust survivors, protagonist of Raquela: A Woman of Israel
- Spouses: Dr. Arik Brzezinski (died 1963); Dr. Moshe Prywes
- Children: 2
- Awards: National Jewish Book Award (1979)

Raquela Prywes (Hebrew: רחלה פריבס; born Raquela Levy, 1924 in Jerusalem; died March, 1985) was a nurse in Israel, trained in midwifery and obstetrics at the Hadassah Medical Center. A ninth generation Jerusalemite, Raquela is the chief protagonist in the eponymous book, written by Ruth Gruber, who, in 1978, spent a year in Israel writing the life story. The book won the National Jewish Book Award in 1979 for Best Book on Israel, Raquela: A Woman of Israel, written by Ruth Gruber.

Raquela graduated from nursing at Hadassah Hospital, on Mount Scopus, years prior to the founding of the State of Israel.

After Jordan seized East Jerusalem, in 1948, she worked in the baby's ward at Hadassah Hospital 'A'. She was chosen by her superiors for special duties, being sent to the British Atlit detainee camp and on Cyprus internment camps, deliver babies and care for mothers, in the worst of conditions. On her return from Cyprus, she helped build the nursery wards in Jerusalem and, later, in Beersheba.

She married Dr. Arik Brzezinski, a prominent obstetrician, and worked closely with him. They had two sons, Amnon and Raphael. Amnon later became head of the Patricia and Russell Fleischman Women's Health Center, and Department of Obstetrics & Gynecology, at the Hadassah Medical Center, in Jerusalem.

After his death in 1963, she married her late husband's friend and colleague, then a widower, Dr. Moshe Prywes (assistant dean of the Hadassah– Hebrew University Medical Center, and later dean of the Ben-Gurion University of the Negev, and after whom the Moshe Prywes Center for Medical Education, Ben Gurion University of the Negev, is named). She helped deliver Jewish and Bedouin babies at the new Beersheva hospital, and saved the life of Sarah, Golda Meir's only daughter, who almost died from eclampsia.

Raquela Prywes died of hepatitis acquired from a blood transfusion in March 1985, at the age of 60 years.
