= Billy Collins =

American poet

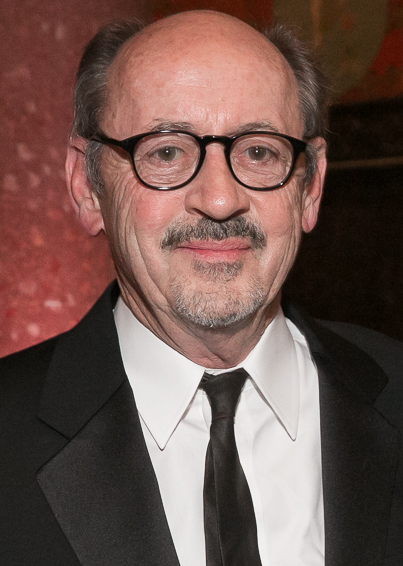
- Collins in 2015
- Born: William James Collins; March 22, 1941 (age 85); New York City, New York, U.S.
- Education: College of the Holy Cross (BA); University of California, Riverside (MA, PhD)
- Occupations: Poet; author; professor
- Spouses: Diane Olbright (m. 1977, divorced) Suzannah Gail Collins (m. 2019)
- Writing career
- Notable works: The Apple That Astonished Paris; Questions About Angels; The Art of Drowning
- Notable awards: Norman Mailer Prize for Poetry (2014); Helmerich Award (2016); American Academy of Arts and Letters (2016)

United States Poet Laureate
- In office 2001–2003
- Preceded by: Stanley Kunitz
- Succeeded by: Louise Glück

Poet Laureate of New York
- In office 2004–2006
- Preceded by: John Ashbery
- Succeeded by: Jean Valentine

William James Collins (born March 22, 1941) is an American poet who served as the Poet Laureate of the United States from 2001 to 2003. He was a distinguished professor at Lehman College of the City University of New York, retiring in 2016. Collins was recognized as a Literary Lion of the New York Public Library (1992) and selected as the New York State Poet for 2004 through 2006. In 2016, Collins was inducted into the American Academy of Arts and Letters. As of 2020, he is a teacher in the MFA program at Stony Brook Southampton.

== Early life and education ==
Collins was born in Manhattan on March 22, 1941. He was raised in Jackson Heights, Queens and White Plains. His father, William Collins, was of Irish descent, and his mother, Katherine, was from Canada. Katherine worked as a nurse who stopped working to raise the couple's only child. William was a worker on Wall Street who Collins has cited as an inspiration for his humor.

After attending Archbishop Stepinac High School, Collins graduated from the College of the Holy Cross in Worcester, Massachusetts, with a Bachelor of Arts in English literature in 1963. He then earned his M.A. and Ph.D. in romantic poetry from the University of California, Riverside. As a graduate student, Collins studied under poet and Victorian literature scholar Robert Peters. He also came under the influence of contemporary poets such as Karl Shapiro, Howard Nemerov and Reed Whittemore, and during his adolescence he was influenced by Beat Generation poets as well. In 1975, Collins founded The Mid-Atlantic Review with his friends Walter Blanco and Steve Bailey.

== Career ==
Collins was a Distinguished Professor of English at Lehman College in the Bronx, where he joined the faculty in 1968. He is a founding Advisory Board member of the CUNY Institute for Irish-American Studies at Lehman College. Collins has taught and served as a visiting writer at Sarah Lawrence College in Bronxville, New York as well as teaching workshops across the U.S. and in Ireland. Collins is a member of the faculty of SUNY Stony Brook Southampton, where (2015) he teaches poetry workshops.

Collins was named U.S. Poet Laureate in 2001 and held the title until 2003. As Poet Laureate, Collins instituted the program Poetry 180 for high schools. Collins chose 180 poems for the program and the accompanying book, Poetry 180: A Turning Back to Poetry—one for each day of the school year. Collins edited a second anthology, 180 More Extraordinary Poems for Every Day to refresh the supply of available poems. Collins served as Poet Laureate for the State of New York from 2004 until 2006. Collins served a stint with the Winter Park Institute in Winter Park, Florida, an affiliate of Rollins College. In 2012, Collins became Poetry Consultant for Smithsonian Magazine.

During the summer of 2013 Collins guest hosted Garrison Keillor's popular daily radio broadcast, The Writer's Almanac, on NPR. Collins has been invited to read at The White House three times—in 2001, 2011, and 2014. In 2014 he traveled to Russia as a cultural emissary of the U.S. State Department. In 2013 and 2015, Collins toured with the singer-songwriter Aimee Mann, performing on stage with her in a music-poetry-conversation format. Collins and Paul Simon have engaged in four onstage conversations about poetry, music, and lyrics, starting in 2008. The conversations were held in 2008 at New York's 92nd Street Y and The Winter Park Institute, in 2013 at the Chautauqua Institution, and in 2013 at Emory University as part of the Richard Ellman Lectures in Modern Literature, where Simon was the 2013 Richard Ellman Lecturer.

Collins presented a TED talk, Everyday moments, caught in time at TED 2012. Collins, as one of the Favorite 100 TED speakers of all time, was invited to give another TED talk at TED 2014 in Vancouver, Canada.

As U.S. Poet Laureate, Collins read his poem The Names at a special joint session of the United States Congress on September 6, 2002, held to remember the victims of the 9/11 attacks. Though, unlike their British counterparts, U.S. poets laureate are not asked or expected to write occasional poetry, Collins was asked by the Librarian of Congress to write a poem especially for that event. Collins initially refused to read "The Names" in public, though he has read it two times in public since 2002. He vowed not to include it in any of his books, refusing to capitalize on the 9/11 attacks. However, "The Names" was included in The Poets Laureate Anthology put out by the Library of Congress, for which Collins wrote the foreword. At the time the only book-published version of "The Names", it contained a number of typographical errors. The poem also appeared in the New York Times, September 6, 2002. Collins finally agreed to include "The Names" in his new and selected volume Aimless Love in 2013.

In 1997, Collins recorded The Best Cigarette, a collection of 34 of his poems, that would become a bestseller. In 2005, the CD was re-released under a Creative Commons license, allowing free, non-commercial distribution of the recording. He also recorded two of his poems for the audio versions of Garrison Keillor's collection Good Poems (2002). Collins has appeared on Keillor's radio show, A Prairie Home Companion, numerous times, where he gained a portion of his large following. In 2005, Collins recorded Billy Collins Live: A Performance in New York City. Collins was introduced by his friend, actor Bill Murray.

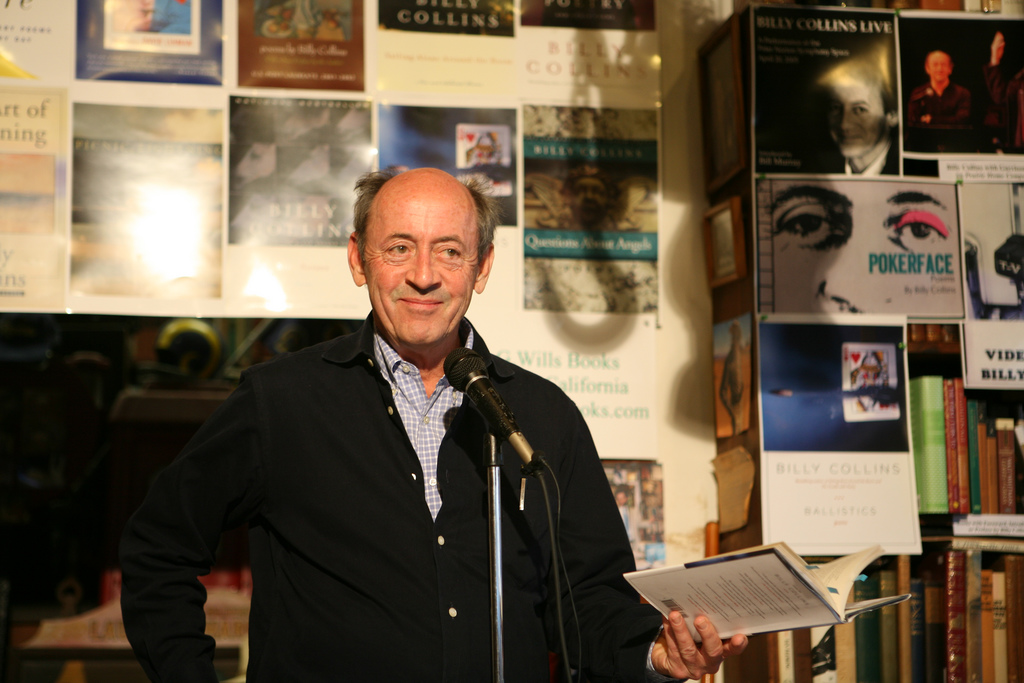
Collins in La Jolla, San Diego, 2008

Collins has been called "The most popular poet in America" by the New York Times. When he moved from the University of Pittsburgh Press to Random House, the advance he received shocked the poetry world—a six-figure sum for a three-book deal, virtually unheard of in poetry. The deal secured for Collins through his literary agent, Chris Calhoun, then of Sterling Lord Literistic, with the editor Daniel Menaker, remained the talk of the poetry world, and indeed the literary world, for quite some time.

Over the years, the U.S. magazine Poetry has awarded Collins several prizes in recognition of poems they publish. During the 1990s, Collins won five such prizes. The magazine also selected him as "Poet of the Year" in 1994. In 2005 Collins was the first annual recipient of its Mark Twain Prize for Humor in Poetry. He has received fellowships from the National Endowment for the Arts, the New York Foundation for the Arts and in 1993, from the John Simon Guggenheim Foundation.

One of his most critically acclaimed works, "Fishing on the Susquehanna in July", has been added to the preserved works of the United States Native American literary registry as being deemed a culturally significant poem. The poem has been included on national Advance Placement exams for high school students.

In 2012, Collins appeared as himself in an episode of the PBS animated series Martha Speaks.

Collins is on the editorial board at The Alaska Quarterly Review. Most recently he contributed to the 30th anniversary edition. He is on the advisory board at the Southern Review and is similarly named in other journals.

During the COVID-19 stay-at-home confinement period in 2020, Collins appeared daily on Facebook Live, reading poems and talking about poetry.

== Personal life ==
In 1977 Collins married Diane Olbright, and later settled in Westchester County, New York. The couple have since divorced. Collins moved in 2007 from New York to Winter Park, Florida, to be with Suzannah Gilman, his fiancée, an attorney and fellow poet. Collins and Suzannah Gilman married on July 21, 2019, in Southampton, New York.

== Awards and honors ==
- 1983 Fellowship from the New York Foundation for the Arts
- 1986 Fellowship from the National Endowment for the Arts
- 1991 National Poetry Series publication prize. Winner for Questions About Angels
- 1992 New York Public Library "Literary Lion"
- 1993 Fellowship from the John Simon Guggenheim Foundation
- 1994 Poetry magazine's "Poet of the Year"
- 1995 Lenore Marshall Poetry Prize, Academy of American Poets. Shortlist for The Art of Drowning
- 2001 American Irish Historical Society Cultural Award
- 2001–2003 United States Poet Laureate
- 2004–2006 New York State Poet Laureate
- 2005 Mark Twain Award for Humor in Poetry
- 2013 Donald Hall-Jane Kenyon Prize in American Poetry
- 2014 Norman Mailer Prize for Poetry
- 2016 Peggy V. Helmerich Distinguished Author Award
- 2016 American Academy of Arts and Letters

Other Awards include these from Poetry magazine:

- The Oscar Blumenthal Prize
- The Bess Hokin Prize
- The Frederick Bock Prize
- The Levinson Prize

== Bibliography ==
=== Books of poems by Collins ===
- Pokerface (Pasadena, Ca.: Kenmore Press, 1977)
- Video Poems (Long Beach, Ca.: Applezaba Press, 1980)
- The Apple that Astonished Paris: Poems (Fayetteville, Ark.: University of Arkansas Press, 1988)
- Questions about Angels: Poems (New York: Quill/William Morrow, 1991)
- The Art of Drowning (Pittsburgh: University of Pittsburgh Press, 1995)
- Picnic, Lightning (Pittsburgh: University of Pittsburgh Press, 1998)
- Taking off Emily Dickinson's Clothes: Selected Poems (London: Picador, 2000)
- Sailing Alone around the Room: New and Selected Poems (New York: Random House, 2001)
- Nine Horses: Poems (New York: Random House, 2002)
- The Trouble with Poetry and Other Poems (New York: Random House, 2005)
- She Was Just Seventeen (Modern Haiku Press, 2006)
- Ballistics: Poems (New York: Random House, 2006)
- Horoscopes for the Dead: Poems (New York, Random House, 2011)
- Aimless Love: New and Selected Poems (New York: Random House, 2013)
- Voyage (Piermont, N.H.: Bunker Hill Publishing, 2014)
- The Rain in Portugal: Poems (New York: Random House, 2016)
- Whale Day: and other Poems (New York: Random House, 2020)
- Musical Tables: Poems (New York: Random House, 2022)
- Water, Water (New York: Random House, 2024)
- Dog Show (2025)

=== Sound recordings of Collins ===
- Best cigarette [sound recording] / Billy Collins (Chicago: Small Good, 1993)

=== Books edited or introduced by Collins ===
- Poetry 180: a turning back to poetry / selected and with an introduction by Billy Collins (New York: Random House, 2003)
- Leaves of grass / Walt Whitman; with a new foreword by Billy Collins; an introduction by Gay Wilson Allen; and an afterword by Peter Davison (New York: Signet Classics, 2005)
- 180 more : extraordinary poems for every day / selected and with an introduction by Billy Collins (New York: Random House, 2005)
- Bright wings : an illustrated anthology of poems about birds / edited by Billy Collins; paintings by David Allen Sibley (New York: Columbia University Press, 2010)
- Poets laureate anthology / edited and with introductions by Elizabeth Hun Schmidt; foreword by Billy Collins (New York: Norton, 2010)
- Best of poetry in motion : celebrating twenty-five years on subways and buses / edited by Alice Quinn; foreword by Billy Collins (New York: Norton, 2017)

=== Individual poems by Collins in magazines ===
Title	Year	First published	Reprinted/collected
Dancing Toward Bethlehem	1991	Collins, Billy (December 1, 1991). "Dancing Toward Bethlehem". Poetry. Vol. 159, no. 3. p. 138.	
Tanager	2013	Collins, Billy (October 21, 2013). "Tanager". The New Yorker. Vol. 89, no. 33. p. 42.	
Downpour	2019	Collins, Billy (November 18, 2019). "Downpour". The New Yorker. Vol. 95, no. 36. pp. 66–67.	
Days of teen-age glory	2021	Collins, Billy (March 22, 2021). "Days of teen-age glory". The New Yorker. Vol. 97, no. 5. pp. 40–41.	
