= Film (film) =

1965 U.S. film written by Samuel Beckett

- Poster
- Directed by: Alan Schneider
- Written by: Samuel Beckett
- Starring: Buster Keaton
- Cinematography: Boris Kaufman
- Edited by: Sidney Meyers
- Distributed by: Milestone Film & Video, Inc.
- Release dates: September 4, 1965 (Venice Film Festival); January 8, 1966 (U.S.)
- Running time: 24 minutes
- Country: United States
- Language: English

Film is a 1965 short film written by Samuel Beckett, his only screenplay. It was commissioned by Barney Rosset of Grove Press. Writing began on 5 April 1963 with a first draft completed within four days. A second draft was produced by 22 May and a 40-leaf shooting script followed thereafter. It was filmed in New York City in July 1964. Beckett and Alan Schneider originally wanted Charlie Chaplin, Zero Mostel and Jack MacGowran; however, they eventually did not get involved. Beckett then suggested Buster Keaton. James Karen, who was to have a small part in the film, also supported having Keaton. The filmed version differs from Beckett's original script but with his approval since he was on set all the time, this being his only visit to the United States, as stated in the script printed in Collected Shorter Plays of Samuel Beckett (Faber and Faber, 1984).

It was remade by the British Film Institute (1979, 16 mm, 26 minutes) without Beckett's supervision, as Film: a screenplay by Samuel Beckett. David Rayner Clark directed Max Wall.

It first appeared in print in Eh Joe and Other Writings (Faber and Faber, 1967).

== Synopsis ==
Throughout the first two parts, almost everything is seen through the eye of the camera (designated in the script as E), although there are occasional moments when O's perception is seen. In the third part, much more of O's perception of the room and its contents is given. In order to distinguish between the two perceptions, objects seen by O were shot through a lens-gauze, blurring his perception while E's perception was shot without gauze or filters, keeping the images sharp.

=== The street ===
The film opens onto a rippled image that fills the entire screen. Without colour, it is difficult to discern what is being shown, but it is alive. As it moves, it is shown to be an extreme close-up of an eyelid; it fills the entire screen. The eye opens, slowly, closes, opens again, blinks and then fades into a different rippled image, still somewhat organic but changed, still. As the camera begins to pan right and up, it is discernable as a wall; we are outside a building (an old factory situated in Lower Manhattan). It is summer, though it is hard to tell. The camera's movement is not smooth. It is as if it is looking for something. Eventually, it loses interest and pans left and down back to the wall.

Suddenly, the camera (E) shifts violently to the left. A man (O) is hurrying along the wall from left to right. He pauses, hugging the wall, and E gets a chance to focus on him. He has on a long dark overcoat, the collar of which is turned up and his hat is pulled down over his face. (Keaton had asked Beckett what O was wearing underneath. "I hadn't thought of that," the author admitted and then proposed, "the same coat", which appealed to both men.) He is hanging onto a briefcase with his left hand whilst trying to shield the exposed side of his face with the other. He realises he's been seen and cowers against the wall; E quickly shifts behind him.

No longer conscious of being observed, O starts off again, knocking over a trestle and stumbling over a railway sleeper—anything to stay as close as possible to the wall. He charges into a man and woman, knocking the man's hat off. E looks from the man's face to the woman's and back again. The man has a moustache and is wearing a pince-nez. They have been consulting a newspaper, which the woman keeps hold of. They both look appalled at what has happened.

E moves back to a long shot and watches O barge through and on his way. The man replaces his hat, takes off his pince-nez. and looks after the fleeing figure. The couple look at each other and the man "opens his mouth to vituperate" but the woman shushes him, uttering the only sound in the whole play. Together they turn to stare directly at E as an open-mouthed expression takes over their faces; they can not bear to look at what they have seen and turn their faces away. But what had they seen? The action shifts back to O just as he reaches and turns a corner. He heads off down the street until he realises he is at the right doorway. He enters.

=== Stairs ===
The camera cuts to the vestibule. The viewer is directly behind O. Stairs lead up on the left, but O veers right and pauses, pulling himself together. He takes his pulse and E moves in. As soon as he becomes aware of E's presence he rushes down a couple of steps and cowers beside the wall until the camera retreats a little. When it does he reverses back up to street-level and then begins up the stairs.

A frail old woman is coming down. The camera gives us a brief close-up. "She carries a tray of flowers slung from her neck by a strap. She descends slowly and with fumbling feet." O backs up and hurries down the steps to the right again where he sits down on a step and presses his face against the balusters. He glances up briefly to see where she is, then hides his head from view.

As the woman reaches the bottom of the stairs, she looks straight into the lens. The expression on her face changes to the one of wide-eyed horror that was displayed on the faces of the man and woman outside. She closes her eyes and collapses. E checks on where the man had been, but O has made his escape. His coat tails are seen flying up the stairs.

E chases after him and finds him at the top of the first flight. He looks around to see if there is anyone about. Satisfied, he turns left and, not without some difficulty, opens the door to a room and enters. E slips in unnoticed as O locks the door behind him and then takes his pulse once more.

=== The room ===
We find ourselves in a "small barely furnished room." The man—and the camera following him from behind—survey its contents: a dog and a cat share a basket, a caged parrot and a goldfish in its bowl sit atop a small table. The walls are bare, apart from a mirror and an unframed picture pinned to the wall: a Sumerian Tell Asmar figurine with big eyes (described in the screenplay as "the face of God the Father"). There is also a couch with a filthy pillow, some blankets and a rug on it, a rocking chair with a "curiously carved headrest" and there is a window with a tattered roller blind with full-length net curtains to either side.

==== Preparation of room ====
Systematically, O takes each object or creature in the room and disables its ability to 'see' him: he closes the blind and pulls the net curtains across, he covers the mirror with the rug, the cat and dog (“a shy and uncooperative, little Chihuahua”) are – with some difficulty – ejected from the room and the picture is torn up. Although stated simply, the mechanics needed to execute these tasks are laborious (e.g., as he passes the window, he hides behind the blanket which he holds in front of himself to cover the mirror and he carries the cat and dog facing away from him as he tries to put them out the door).

After all the above, he goes to sit in the chair. There are two holes in the headrest that suggest eyes. He ignores them and sits. O takes the folder from his case and goes to open it, but there are "two eyelets, well proportioned"; he turns the folder through 90° but he's disturbed by the parrot's eye and has to get up and cover the cage with his coat. He sits again, repeats the same process with his folder and then has to get up and cover the goldfish bowl, too.

"Beckett initially contemplated setting Film in the evening, but had to decide against it for a practical reason: 'to remove all possibility of his putting off light in room.'"

==== Period in rocking chair ====
Finally O sits down opposite the denuded wall, opens the folder, and takes out seven photographs of himself, which he examines in sequence:

1. 6 months old – in his mother's arms
2. 4 years old – kneeling in an attitude of prayer
3. 15 years old – in his school blazer, teaching a dog to beg
4. 20 years old – in his graduation gown, receiving his scroll from the Rector
5. 21 years old – with his arm around his fiancée
6. 25 years old – a newly enlisted man, with a little girl in his arms
7. 30 years old – looking over forty, wearing a patch over one eye and looking grim

He spends twice as long on pictures 5 and 6. After he looks at the seventh photograph for a few seconds, he rips it up and drops it on the floor. He then works his way through the rest of the photos in reverse order, looking at each one briefly again and then tearing it up. The photograph of him as an infant must be on a tougher mount and he has some difficulty with that one. “[I]n Beckett the distant past is always more tenacious than recent events.” Afterwards he rocks slightly, hands holding the armrests and then checks his pulse once more.

O is now in a similar situation to the man in A Piece of Monologue, who has also destroyed all his old photographs and now stands facing a similarly blank wall.

==== Investment proper ====
(See the opening two paragraphs of Richard Cave's review of the 1979 version of the film for a discussion of the possible definition of 'investment' here).

As O begins to doze off, E begins to move round to his left. Suddenly, O realises he is being watched and turns his head violently to the right. E moves behind him again. He resumes rocking and dozes off. This time E whirls round to the right, passing the window, the mirror, the birdcage and fishbowl and finally stops in front of the space on the wall where the picture was.

E turns around and, for the first time, we are face-to-face with O, asleep in his rocking chair. All of a sudden he wakes and stares straight into the camera lens. He looks very much like the man in the seventh photograph only much older. He still has the eye patch.

He half starts from the chair, then stiffens. Gradually, the horrified look we have seen before on the couple and the old woman's faces appears on his. He is looking at himself, but not the scruffy, wearish man we have been watching. The man before him, standing with a big nail beside his head, has a look of "acute intentness" on his face. O slumps back into the chair and starts rocking. He closes his eye and the expression fades. He covers his face with his hands briefly and then looks again. This time we see the face of E in close-up, just the eyes.

O covers his eyes again, bows his head. The rocking dies down and then stops. The screen goes black. We then see the opening image of the eye, which is frozen, and the credits are presented over it. Once finished, the eye closes and the film is over.

== Interpretation ==
"The greatest Irish film." – Gilles Deleuze

A "load of old bosh." – Dilys Powell (The Sunday Times)

The work is studied by and has been the subject of criticism from both film and theatre scholars, with the former tending to study the film as shot, the latter tending to study the script as written. Critical opinion is mixed, but it is generally held in higher regard by film scholars than it is by theatre or Beckett scholars. The views above represent extremes. A 'middle-ground' review would probably be "a poor attempt by a genuine writer to move into a medium that he simply hadn't the flair or understanding of to make a success". Beckett's own opinion was that it was an “interesting failure.”

The film opens and closes with close-ups of a sightless eye. This inevitably evokes the notorious opening sequence of Un Chien Andalou in which a human eye is sliced open with a razor blade. In fact, The Eye was an early title for Film, though admittedly, at that time, he had not thought of the need for the opening close-up. As a student of French literature, Beckett would have been familiar with Victor Hugo’s poem La Conscience. ‘Conscience’ in French can mean either ‘conscience’ in the English sense or ‘consciousness’ and the double meaning is important. Hugo's poem concerns a man haunted by an eye that stares at him unceasingly from the sky. He runs away from it, ever further, even to the grave, where, in the tomb, the eye awaits him. The man is Cain. He has been trying to escape consciousness of himself, the self that killed his brother, but his conscience will not let him rest. The eye/I is always present and, when he can run no further, must be faced in the tomb.

Film takes its inspiration from the 18th-century Idealist Irish philosopher Berkeley. At the beginning of the work, Beckett uses the quotation: "esse est percipi" (to be is to be perceived). Beckett leaves off a portion of Berkeley's edict, which reads in full: “esse est percipi aut percipere” (to be is to be perceived or to perceive). Alan Schneider, the director of Film, was once asked if he could provide an explanation that ‘the man in the street’ could understand:

"It's a movie about the perceiving eye, about the perceived and the perceiver – two aspects of the same man. The perceiver desires like mad to perceive and the perceived tries desperately to hide. Then, in the end, one wins."

In between takes on the set near the Brooklyn Bridge, Keaton told a reporter something similar, summarizing the theme as "a man may keep away from everybody but he can't get away from himself."

In Beckett's original script, the two main characters, the camera and the man it is pursuing are referred to as E (the Eye) and O (the Object). This simplistic division might lead one to assume that the Eye is only interested in the man it is pursuing. This may be true, but it does not mean it will not have the same effect on anyone who comes in contact with it. "E is both part of O and not part of O; E is also the camera and, through the camera, the eye of the spectator as well. But E is also self, not merely O's self but the self of any person or people, specifically that of the other characters — the elderly couple [sic] and the flower-lady — who respond to its stare with that look of horror." E is, so to speak, O's blind eye. "He has the function of making all with whom he comes into contact self-aware."

O does everything physically possible to avoid being seen by others, but the only thing he can do to avoid perception by an “all seeing god” is to tear up his picture, a symbolic act, as if saying, “If I don't believe you exist you can't see me.” There is no one there to see him for what he really is other than himself and so, in this godless world, it is only fitting that E, representing O's self-perception, would appear standing where the picture has been torn from the wall. O also destroys the photographs of his past, his 'memories' of who he was. Now all that remains for O is to escape from himself - which he achieves by falling asleep until woken by E's intense gaze. The room is more figurative than literal, like many of Beckett's rooms, “as much psychological as physical, 'rooms of the mind', as one ... actor called them.”

If Beckett were Shakespeare he might well have written: "To be seen or not to be seen, that is the question." It is an issue that concerns many of Beckett's characters. At the end of the first act of Waiting for Godot, when the boy wants to know what to tell Mr Godot, Vladimir tells him: “Tell him … (he hesitates) … tell him you saw us. (Pause.) You did see us, didn’t you?” But what happens when you are alone? The narrator of The Unnamable answers: “They depart, one by one, and the voices go on, it’s not theirs, they were never there, there was never anyone but you, talking to you about you…” The old woman in Rockaby appears to be the exact opposite of O but although she actively seeks to be seen by someone while O does everything to avoid perceivedness, the irony is that both characters are alone with only themselves for company.

Beckett's script has been interpreted in various ways. R. C. Lamont writes that "Film deals with the apprenticeship to death, the process of detaching oneself from life. Like the Tibetan Book of the Dead, it teaches the gradual dissolution of self. The veiling of the windows and mirrors, the covering of the birdcage – the extinction of light, reflection and light – are so many ritualistic steps to be taken before final immobility, the resignation of the end.” At the end of Film, O is seated in his rocker with his face buried in his hands; at the end of Rockaby, the old woman's head inclines forward as if, finally, she had died. The final scene in Film is also comparable to the moment in the library when the old man in That Time sees his own reflection in the glass covering a painting.

It could be tempting to think of O and E as a Beckettian Dr Jekyll and Mr Hyde – indeed in notes for the first draft Beckett did toy “with the idea of making ‘E tall’ and ‘O short (and) fat’ which corresponds with the dual physique of Jekyll and Hyde” – but Film is not concerned with representations of good and evil, only with the concept of the second self, of pursuer and pursued.” The special relationship existing between O and E - an atypical case of Doppelgänger - constitutes what has been called "palindromic identity."

For Linda Ben-Zvi, “Beckett does not merely reproduce the modernist critique of and anxiety over technology and the reproduction of art; he attaches 'no truth value' to his critique of technology and the reproduction of the gaze. Instead, he creates a dialogue that awakens and revitalises the uncritical perception of his audience... The work not only is predicated on the form but invariably becomes a critique of its form." Having written a play titled Play and a song called Song, it comes as no surprise that Beckett would entitle his first foray into cinema as Film. The title supports Ben-Zvi's interpretation in that it is a film about cinematic technology: how the movie camera and photographic images are used in Film are essential to understanding it. When he writes, “No truth value attaches to above, regarded as of merely structural and dramatic convenience”, Beckett takes the emphasis away from Berkeley's maxim thus stressing the dramatic structure of the work. The viewers are being asked to consider the work structurally and dramatically rather than emotionally or philosophically.

Film critic and film historian Andrew Sarris briefly mentions Film in his book, The American Cinema: Directors and Directions, 1929-1968. Sarris discusses Film in the context of his section on the film career of Buster Keaton, writing that: "Even Samuel Beckett contributed to the desecration of the Keaton mask by involving the actor of absurdity before its time in a dreary exercise called Film, the most pretentious title in all cinema."

== Beckett and Keaton ==
Beckett had never seen Schneider direct any of his plays and yet continued to entrust him with the work. However, for this particular project, Beckett became personally involved. Schneider has speculated that it may simply have been the opportunity to work directly with Keaton. It has even been suggested that one inspiration for Waiting for Godot might have come from a 1949 film called The Lovable Cheat in which Keaton has a small part as a man who is convinced by the main character, who owes him money, to wait endlessly for a man named Godeau, who will pay the debt.

When Schneider managed to hunt up Keaton, he found that genius of the silent screen — old, broke, ill, and alone — some $2 million ahead in a four-handed poker game with an imaginary Louis B. Mayer of MGM and two other invisible Hollywood moguls.

“Yes, I accept the offer," were silent Keaton's unexpected first words to Schneider. Keaton was dying even as they made the film. "We didn’t know that," Rosset told interviewer Patsy Southgate in 1990, "but looking back at it, the signs were there. Couldn’t speak — he was not so much difficult, he just wasn’t there." Keaton would in fact die eighteen months after the shooting of Film.

From this one might think that Keaton jumped at the chance, but this was not the case. James Karen remembers:

“He had to be talked into it by Eleanor [his wife] and I remember calling and saying, ‘You know, it could be your Les Enfants du paradis. It could be that wonderful, wonderful thing.’”

Beckett had wanted to work with Keaton several years earlier, when he offered him the role of Lucky in the American stage premiere of Waiting for Godot, but Buster turned it down. It's said that Buster didn't understand Godot and had misgivings about this script as well. Presumably this went a long way to make him think twice about this new project.

During a meeting with historian and documentary filmmaker Kevin Brownlow, Beckett was quite forthcoming:

“Buster Keaton was inaccessible. He had a poker mind as well as a poker face. I doubt if he ever read the text - I don't think he approved of it or liked it. But he agreed to do it and he was very competent … Of course, I had seen his silent films and enjoyed them – don't suppose I could remember them now. He had a young woman with him – his wife, who had picked him up from his alcoholism. We met him at a hotel. I tried to engage him in conversation, but it was no good. He was absent. He didn't even offer us a drink. Not because he was being unfriendly, but because it never occurred to him.”

Schneider's recollection of that awkward first meeting confirms all of this and more: “They simply had nothing to say to each other, no worlds of any kind to share. And all of Sam's good will and my own failing efforts to get something started failed to bring them together on any level. It was a disaster.”

But not entirely. Although the role called for Beckett's seemingly ubiquitous bowler hat, Keaton had brought along some of his trademark flattened-down Stetsons and it was quickly agreed that he should wear one of those. On the Monday morning they “traipsed down in Joe Coffey's ancient Morgan to just beneath the shadow of Brooklyn Bridge and began the shooting.” Beckett continues:

“The heat was terrible - while I was staggering in the humidity, Keaton was galloping up and down and doing whatever we asked of him. He had great endurance, he was very tough and, yes, reliable. And when you saw that face at the end - oh!’ He smiled, ‘At last’”

Both Beckett and Schneider were novices; Keaton a seasoned veteran. That said, “Keaton's behaviour on the set was … steady and cooperative … He was indefatigable if not exactly loquacious. To all intents and purposes, we were shooting a silent film, and he was in his best form. He encouraged [Schneider] to give him vocal directions during the shot, sometimes starting over again without stopping the camera if he felt he hadn't done something well the first time. (Nor did he believe much in rehearsal, preferring the spontaneity of performance.) Often when [the crew was] stumped over a technical problem with the camera, he came through with suggestions, inevitably prefacing his comments by explaining that he had solved such problems many times at the Keaton Studios back in 1927.”

Both Beckett and Schneider pronounced themselves more than pleased with Keaton's performance; the latter called him "magnificent."

Keaton's negative comments about the film are often reported but this final recollection by Schneider may redress the balance: “[W]hatever he may have subsequently said to interviewers or reporters about not understanding a moment of what he was doing or what the film was about, what I remember best of our final farewell on the set was that he smiled and half-admitted those six pages were worth doing after all.”

In February 1965, when on a trip to West Berlin, “in deference to his recent work with Buster Keaton, he went to see Keaton again in his 1927 film The General, finding it, however, disappointing.”

Canadian playwright Sherry MacDonald wrote a play, The Stone Face, based on the encounter between Beckett, Keaton and Schneider.

== See also ==
- Notfilm, 2015 documentary
- List of American films of 1965
- Eraserhead by David Lynch
