= Fort Ontario Emergency Refugee Shelter =

Human settlement in United States of America

Coordinates: 43.462372°N 76.503194°W

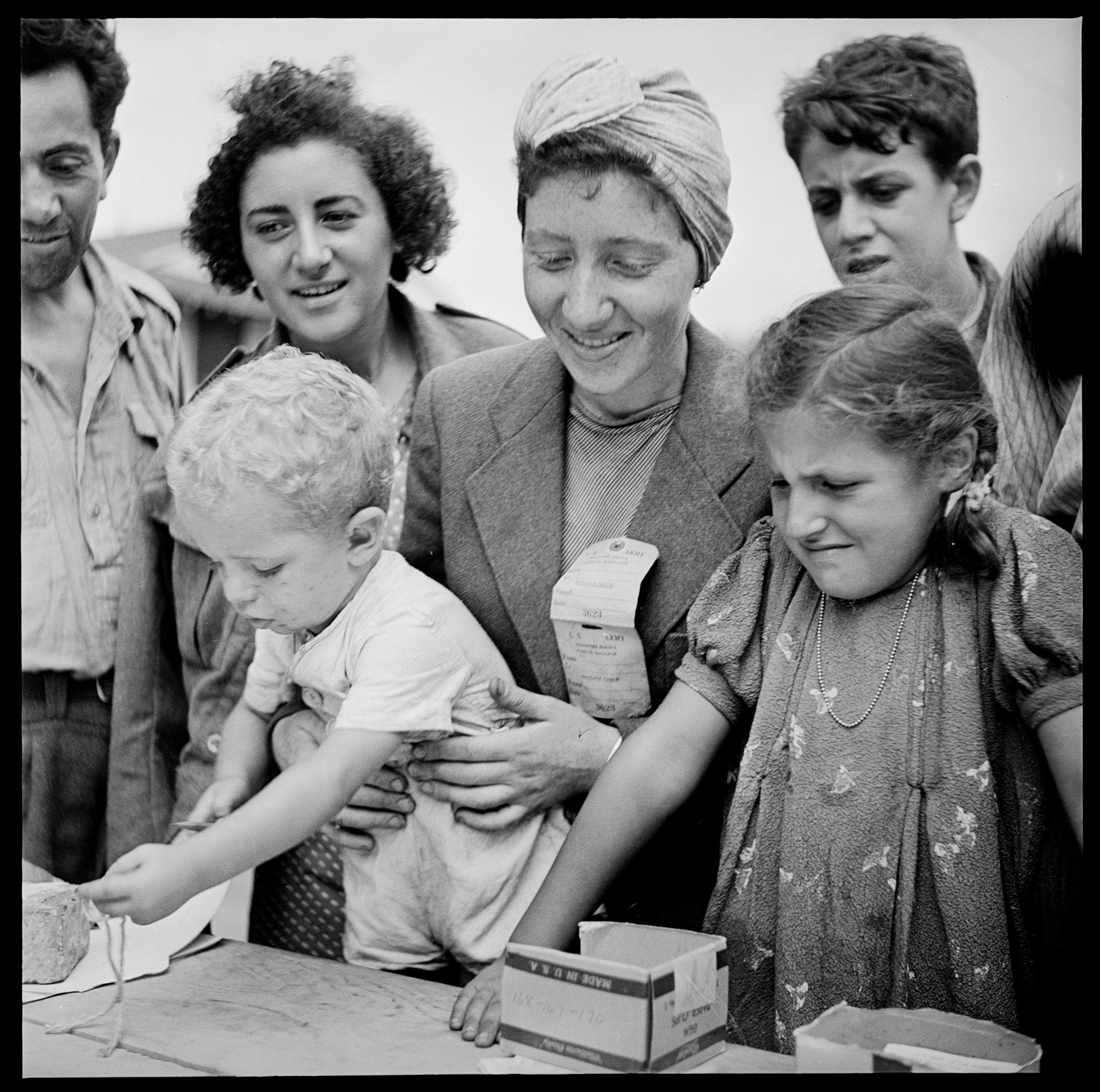
Refugees Registering at the Fort Ontario Refugee Camp, Oswego, New York, 08-1944

The Fort Ontario Emergency Refugee Shelter, also known as "Safe Haven", located in Oswego, New York, was the first and only refugee center established in the United States during World War II. From 1944 to 1945, the shelter housed 982 refugees from Nazi-occupied Europe, of whom 912 were Jewish and the others were not. The effort was called "Safe Haven". The refugee shelter is now the Safe Haven Holocaust Refugee Shelter Museum. The shelter was established by the War Refugee Board. Including non-Jewish refugees was a way for the Roosevelt Administration to make the project palatable to the American public.

== Location ==
Fort Ontario was located on 80 acres that overlooked Lake Ontario. The purpose of the fort changed multiple times throughout its history. At various points, it was a British fur trading post, then an active military post for the US Army from The War of 1812, all the way through World War II as well as a major supply depot for its whole active service, then an educational camp for people who were illiterate, before finally being closed on March 15, 1944. Oswego, New York, which had benefited from the revenue that came from the soldiers at the fort, sent a delegation to Washington, D.C. to ask for the fort to be reopened. The answer was to reopen the fort as a Refugee Shelter.

== Refugee camp ==
The War Refugee Board (WRB) was responsible for creating the camp, selecting the occupants and the overall policy until the closure of the camp on June 6, 1945. While creating and implementing their policies, the War Refugee Board always kept in mind the possible influence of the Fort Ontario Emergency Refugee Shelter on other, larger, refugee concerns.

The War Relocation Authority already had previous experience running a refugee camp within the United States. They had been responsible for formulating and implementing policies in the Japanese Relocation Centers. Their concerns were based solely on responding to problems of daily camp life. As such, there were sharp differences between how the two agencies thought the camp should be run. The WRA had found, while running the Japanese Relocation Centers, that in order to run a camp smoothly and prevent rebellion, policies had to be set out before the establishment of the camps. While the WRB wanted to implement camp policies gradually after the establishment of the camp in order to test public opinion and gain public support.

== History ==
During the 1930s and '40s there was a large amount of antisemitism and opposition to immigration in the United States, with a poll in 1943 showing that 78% of American opposed letting in refugees while several polls between 1940 and 1945 showed 31-48% of American sympathized with or supported antisemitism. This viewpoint was opposed by Jewish groups, several Christian groups, the YMCA, many in the media, and many politicians. To appease the latter groups while not upsetting the former too much, President Roosevelt decided to set up a small refugee camp which was just a token concession and not a significant change in policy.

Among the residents of Oswego the refugees were received extremely well with local president of the Chamber of Commerce and local newspaper owner E.M Waterbury estimating 90% of the population supported the presence of the refugees.

On June 12, 1944, the Fort Ontario Emergency Refugee Shelter was established in Oswego, New York by order of President Franklin D. Roosevelt and was operated by the War Relocation Authority. It was the first and only refugee center established in the United States. In August 1944, the shelter received 982 refugees of whom 93% were Jewish with the majority of the rest being Greek with the majority of the remainder being Catholics the group consisted of 369 Yugoslavians, 237 were Austrian, 146 were Poles, 96 were German, 71 were Czechs the rest came from other groups.

A big concern with the establishment of the camp was the issue of immigration. However, President Roosevelt made clear that immigration laws were not going to be ignored. The refugees would merely be in the United States, not citizens of the United States. They would have no visa status. President Roosevelt also assured Congress that the Army would not permit any refugee escapes. Initially, plans were made to install spotlights along the existing 6-foot chain-link fence, as well as having 150 armed guards around the camp perimeter. Neither of these measures were implemented. Because of their immigration status as "guests", the refugees would not be able to work, and they would not be allowed to travel beyond Oswego.

When Germany surrendered on May 6, 1945, twenty-four days after President Roosevelt's death, the question of what to do with the camp became a pressing issue. Internment was becoming increasingly difficult to support. The problem was whether to return the refugees to their home countries or to admit them into the United States. Most of the refugees wanted to stay. In fact, 60% of them had active immigration cases pending.

A subcommittee voted to close the camp, and the shelter was closed in February 1946. Some refugees chose to return to Europe, whether to find family members, or under the impression that their homes and businesses still remained as they had left them. Some were desperate to remain in the United States and not return to a country where they believed they had no future. Those from Central and Eastern Europe did not want to return to their countries that were now under Soviet occupation. Many were granted permanent or temporary status and allowed to stay in the country, sometimes ending up in the homes of family or friends. Others would later start a new life in newly formed Israel in 1948.

== Selection and early processing in Italy ==
When it came to selecting the refugees who would be permitted to come to the United States, there were special criteria established by the WRB and President Roosevelt. Special Representative Leonard Ackermann along with Ruth Gruber, a reporter, traveled to Italy, to conduct the selection and then bring those selected to the port at Naples. The criteria established for the refugees were that they should be refugees for whom no other havens were available. Roosevelt also stated that the group should include mostly women and children – able-bodied men of military age would not be included – along with a couple rabbis, half a dozen doctors, and enough skilled workers to maintain the camp. Pregnant women who were in their third trimester could not be let onboard the ship because there were no facilities in the likely event the latter was to go into labor. Some women made an effort to hide their pregnancy in order to get into the ship. Refugees who had fled Yugoslavia who were communist sympathizers or had political ties to Josip Broz Tito were not allowed. Only those who swore loyalty to Yugoslavia's monarch Peter II and wanted nothing to do with Tito, Joseph Stalin and the Communist Party were accepted.

The President of the United States has announced that approximately one thousand non-Italian refugees will be brought to the United States from Italy. The refugees will be maintained in a refugee shelter to be established at Fort Ontario near Oswego in the State of New York, where under appropriate conditions they will remain for the duration of the war. The refugees will be brought to the United States outside the regular immigration procedure The shelter will be equipped to take good care of the refugees and it is contemplated that they will be returned to their homes at the end of the war. It is planned to select and move applicants for this refugee shelter as soon as possible. Preference will be given to those refugees for whom no other haven or refuge is immediately available. Therefore, if you desire to make application for admission please fill out the form below. Please use only one form for yourself and all members of your immediate family. Notification of acceptance for movement will be given as quickly as possible after your applications has been received.

— Displaced Persons Sub-Commission; Allied Control Commission, Notice And Application, June 20, 1944

An abandoned mental asylum in Aversa, Italy was used as a central collection area for the refugees. After the selection, Ackermann brought the refugees to Naples, Italy, where the USAT Henry Gibbins, a troop transport ship, was waiting to join a convoy.

Aside from the days waiting in the Naples port, it took 17 days for the Henry Gibbins to cross the Atlantic Ocean. For most of the refugees, the trip was extremely uncomfortable. There were triple-tiered canvas hammocks instead of the luxury liner with beds and sheets that they were expecting. Also, they came under enemy fire soon after entering the Atlantic. As was standard procedure, the ship released black smoke to act as camouflage, but when someone forgot to open the vents, the lower decks were filled with smoke, adding to the terror of the refugees below. In addition, the mix of a normal diet and sea travel had a bad effect on those who had been used to hunger and poor nutrition. Most were sick a good portion of the journey, and some remained so for the entire time.

The Henry Gibbins arrived in New York City on August 3, 1944. The refugees had to remain on the ship one last night to allow returning wounded servicemen to be removed from the other ships in the convoy and brought to hospitals.

The experience of disembarking was traumatic for some of the refugees. They were subjected to the same routine performed on all returning servicemen, but without explanation, adding to their confusion and fear. They were sprayed for delousing under the presence of armed guards. It was only then that they could leave on a two-day train ride for Oswego.

== Life at the shelter ==
Upon arriving at Fort Ontario, many of the refugees were surprised, scared, and angered to see that the fort was surrounded in barbed-wire topped fences. They felt that they had left Europe expecting to be brought to safety and freedom but had instead been brought to another concentration camp. It was only after explanations from staff at the fort that the refugees began to accept the fence. However, there was a lack of freedom in the camp. For the first month, the refugees were not allowed to leave the camp. Even relatives who had traveled to Oswego were not allowed to enter the camp, and they had to visit with their relatives through the chain-link fence. Some local citizens from Oswego visited the camp to welcome the newcomers, passing sweets and gifts through the fence and people from Syracuse, Utica, Tupper Lake, Sackets Harbor, Mexico, Rome, Poland, Russia, Frankfort, Ilion, Watertown and Queensbury of Jewish, Catholic or Protestant descent came to give parcels or donations of clothes, food and even toys for the children.

In the Fort Ontario Emergency Refugee Shelter, there were 496 "units" (which are defined as either families or unaccompanied individuals). The refugees had undergone great trauma, and as a result needed to recuperate. Nearly 100 of the refugees had been imprisoned in Buchenwald or Dachau, which some managed to escape. Others were hidden and aided by members of resistance groups, kindly neighbors or who made deals with black market smugglers and to get them to where advancing Allied Soldiers were nearby. Many of them had been refugees for 7 or 8 years, and almost all had suffered through food shortages, disease, torture and trauma. Another group of refugees were civilian internees of Italian concentration camps but were released following the Italian Armistice and told by their former guards to head south to avoid being recaptured by the Germans.

Many had the hopes of joining relatives who were already in the United States. Others had different reasons for wanting to come to the refugee camp in Oswego. Some were interested in the health care that they could receive in the United States, and had come to Oswego to regain their health. Others were interested in the education system that may be available to their children. Others were looking for jobs or economic opportunities offered in the United States.

However, the camp was neither aware of nor concerned with the expectations that the refugees came with. Their intention was to provide for the basic needs for the refugees, and had not intended to provide more than the basics. There was no plan for health care other than that which threatened the health of an individual or the group, and there were no plans to educate any of the child refugees although refugee children and teenagers were allowed by the town to attended local schools and tutors were allowed to come into the camp.

Of the 982 refugees that lived in the refugee camp at Fort Ontario, 187 were under the age of 16, and 116 were over the age of 60. A large majority of the group was Jewish, while others were Roman Catholic, Protestant, and Greek and Russian Orthodox. Religious differences - as well as differences due to age and nationality - caused tension among the refugees in the camp.

While in the camp, many complained about the loss of freedoms they encountered there. There were confiscations by U.S. Customs, censorship of their mail, and they were also unable to leave the camp. In September, however, the quarantine was lifted. Residents of the camp received 6 hour passes to Oswego. Thousands of visitors poured into the camp. On September 20, 1945 Eleanor Roosevelt, accompanied by Mrs. Henry Morgenthau Jr., visited the camp.

A group of boys at the shelter formed a Boy Scout troop.

== In media ==
- In 2001, CBS aired a made-for-TV film titled Haven about the refugee shelter and Ruth Gruber.
- In 2012, the television show Ghost Hunters conducted a paranormal investigation at the site.
