= Multiple SIDosis =

Multiple SIDosis is a 1970 short film in which a single performer creates an entire multi-part performance of the song "Nola". It is an example of a kind of one-man-band musical performance.

== Summary ==
Multiple SIDosis, written by, directed by and starred Sid Laverents, features as many as twelve split-screen "copies" of Laverents playing various conventional and improvised instruments simultaneously. The separately-recorded performances of the various parts were overdubbed and visually composited to create the final piece.

== Technique ==
The overdubbing technique has been used before and since in professional recording studios, to allow a single performer to create an entire multi-instrument song. Digital technology has made the technique much easier for amateurs to employ today, but no such labour-saving devices were available to Laverents.

== Legacy ==
In 2000, Multiple SIDosis was selected for preservation in the United States National Film Registry by the Library of Congress as being "culturally, historically, or aesthetically significant".
