= Fort Ontario =

State historic site of New York, US

- U.S. National Register of Historic Places
- New York State Register of Historic Places
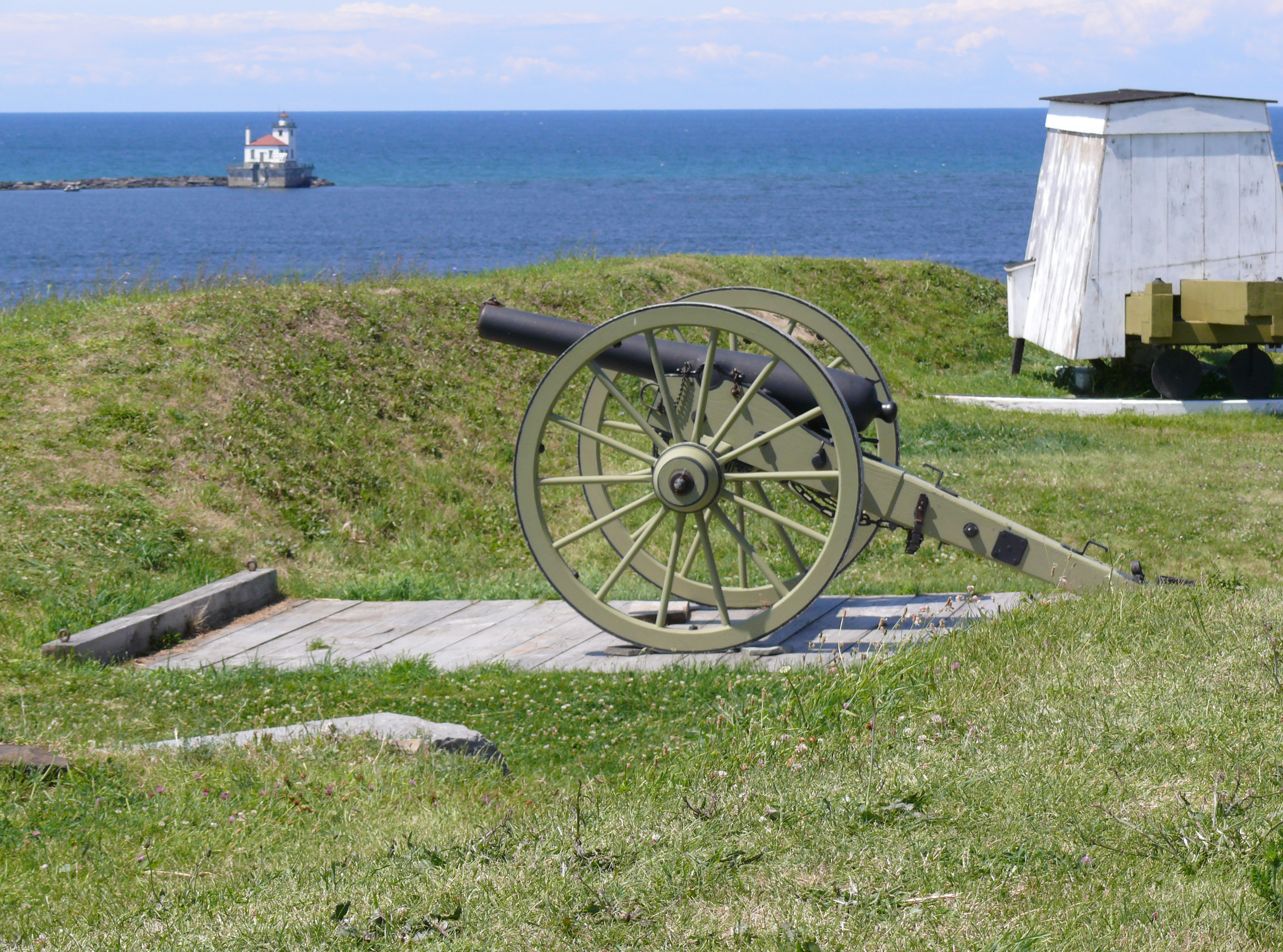
- View from Fort Ontario

- Location within New York Location within the United States
- Location: 1 E. 4th St. and Lake Ontario, Oswego, New York
- Coordinates: 43°27′57″N 76°30′29″W
- Area: 36 acres (15 ha)
- Built: 1839
- NRHP reference No.: 70000426
- NYSRHP No.: 07540.000009

Significant dates
- Added to NRHP: December 18, 1970
- Designated NYSRHP: June 23, 1980

Fort Ontario is a historic bastion fort used by British and American forces, located in the City of Oswego in Oswego County, New York, US. Fort Ontario is located on the east side of the Oswego River on high ground overlooking Lake Ontario. The present fortifications are built on a pentagonal plan with five bastions. The fort is on the National Register of Historic Places. It is owned by the state of New York and operated as a museum known as Fort Ontario State Historic Site.

Originally erected in 1755, it was one of several forts erected by the British to protect the area around the east end of Lake Ontario. During the American Revolutionary War, it was destroyed by American forces in 1778; the British rebuilt the fort in 1782 and held it until 1796. The fort was again destroyed by British forces in 1814, and it was rebuilt during the American Civil War following a period of disuse. In the 20th century, it served variously as a military hospital, an infantry base, an induction center, and a World War II refugee camp. Although closed by the U.S. Army after World War II, some of the buildings at Fort Ontario are still used for training by the Army Reserve.

== 18th century ==
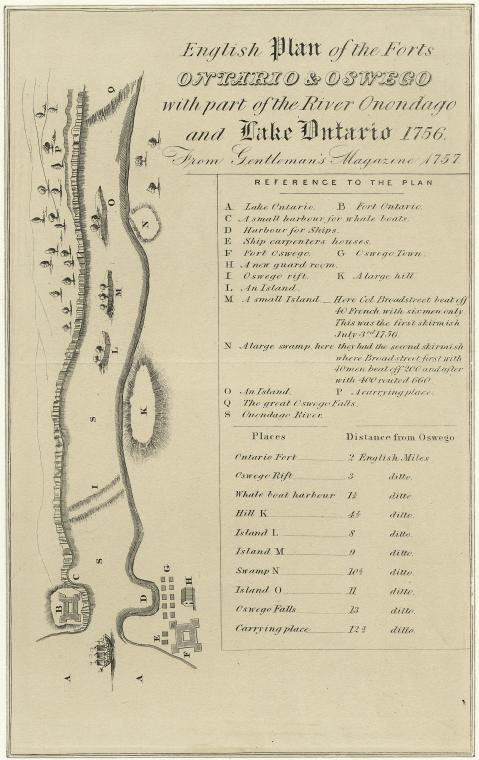
A 1757 map showing the defenses around the mouth of the Oswego River (image shows replica map from 1850)

Fort Ontario was one of several forts erected by the British to protect the area around the east end of Lake Ontario. The original Fort Ontario was erected in 1755, during the French and Indian War, in order to bolster defenses already in place at Fort Oswego on the opposite side of the river. At that time its name was the "Fort of the Six Nations," but the fort was destroyed by French forces during the Battle of Fort Oswego in 1756 and rebuilt by British forces in 1759.

At the conclusion of Pontiac's War, Pontiac urged moderation and agreed to travel to New York, where he made a formal treaty with William Johnson at Fort Ontario on July 25, 1766.

During the American Revolutionary War, a detachment from the 3rd New York Regiment destroyed the fort in July 1778, after the British abandoned it. The British returned and rebuilt the fort in 1782. There was an aborted attack on the fort by Colonel Marinus Willet in 1783. The British held the fort after the war was over until 1796 after the signing of Jay's Treaty.

== 19th century ==
The fort was attacked and destroyed by British forces in 1814 during the War of 1812. After a period of disuse, new construction was undertaken in part because of tensions with Great Britain as well as to check smuggling activities between Canada and the United States.

During the American Civil War the new construction began at the fort because of fear of British help from Canada to the Confederacy. After the American Civil War it held Company F, 42nd Infantry which consisted of wounded soldiers from the war that had reenlisted in the U.S. Army. Although the fort remained a military base, the fort itself fell into ruin, since funds were used to create more modern quarters outside the fort.

== 20th century ==
When the United States entered World War I in April 1917, the fort was repurposed as a military hospital, known as General Hospital No. 5. The facility was used to train medical personnel before they were posted to France.

In 1921, the fort again became an infantry base, initially the 28th Infantry Regiment and in 1933, the 2nd Brigade of the U.S. 1st Infantry Division called Fort Ontario home until the brigade was deactivated on June 1, 1940. During this period, some of the historic buildings inside the fort were restored and a golf course was laid out on the grassy ramparts.

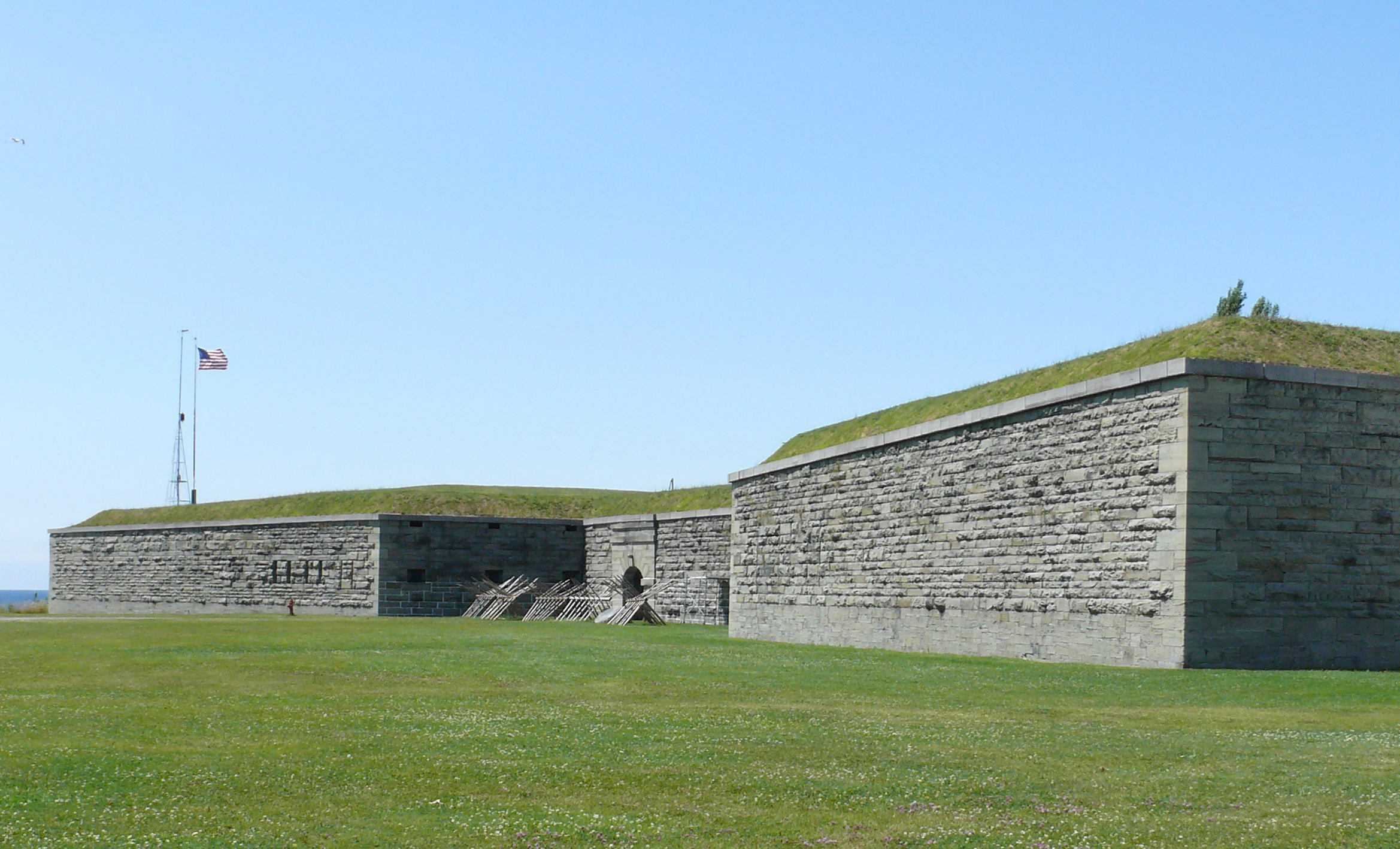
The walls of Fort Ontario

In 1940, the fort was refurbished as an induction center for new conscripts with 60 new buildings for 3,000 men, but it was used instead as a base for several National Guard anti-aircraft units. As America entered World War II, Fort Ontario was repurposed again as a training center for African American military police.

Later in the war, the fort was home to 982 Jewish refugees, from August 1944 to February 1946. The Fort Ontario Emergency Refugee Shelter was the only attempt by the United States to shelter Jewish refugees during the war. After the end of the war the refugees were kept in internment because of disagreements concerning whether or not to allow them to become United States citizens. In January 1946, the decision was made to allow them to become citizens, and by February all of the Jewish refugees were allowed to leave Fort Ontario.

== Current use ==
Although closed by the U.S. Army after World War II, some of the buildings at Fort Ontario are still used for training by the Army Reserve.

The restored fort is open to the public as a state historic site. It was listed on the National Register of Historic Places in 1970. In 2010, Fort Ontario was one of the state-funded historical sites named by Governor David Paterson as being potentially unfunded because of the budget crisis faced by New York State. In response, many of the citizens of Oswego and students of the State University of New York at Oswego have joined together in support of the historical site.

The Safe Haven Holocaust Refugee Shelter Museum operates in a building south of the fort.

== Description ==
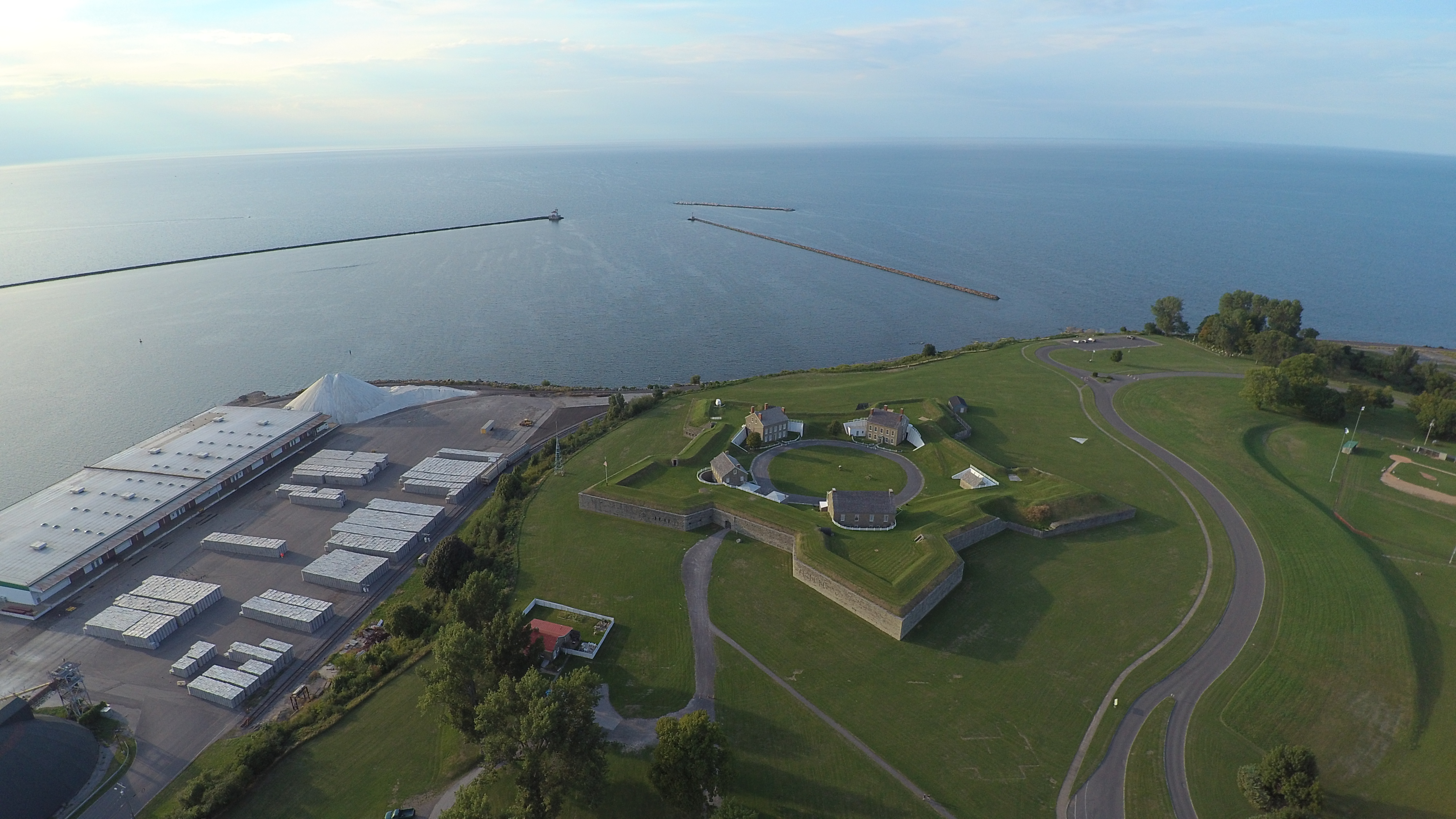
Aerial view of Fort Ontario showing the five bastions.

The present fortifications are built on a pentagonal plan with five bastions, similar to the layout of Fort Jackson, Louisiana. It was designed for heavy cannon mounted en barbette (i.e. in the open firing over the parapet), but howitzers were mounted in casemates built into the ramparts of the bastions. The stone-faced scarp walls of the bastions were also pierced with loopholes for rifle fire, which are of varying design, reflecting the preferences of the different engineers overseeing the construction. Originally, a ravelin protected the side of the fort facing Lake Ontario and mounted further heavy guns.

The current layout of the fort includes Officer Quarters #1, the Powder Magazine, the Enlisted Men's Barracks, the Storehouse, and Officer Quarters #2. There are also two guardhouses by the entrance of the tunnel to the main entrance.

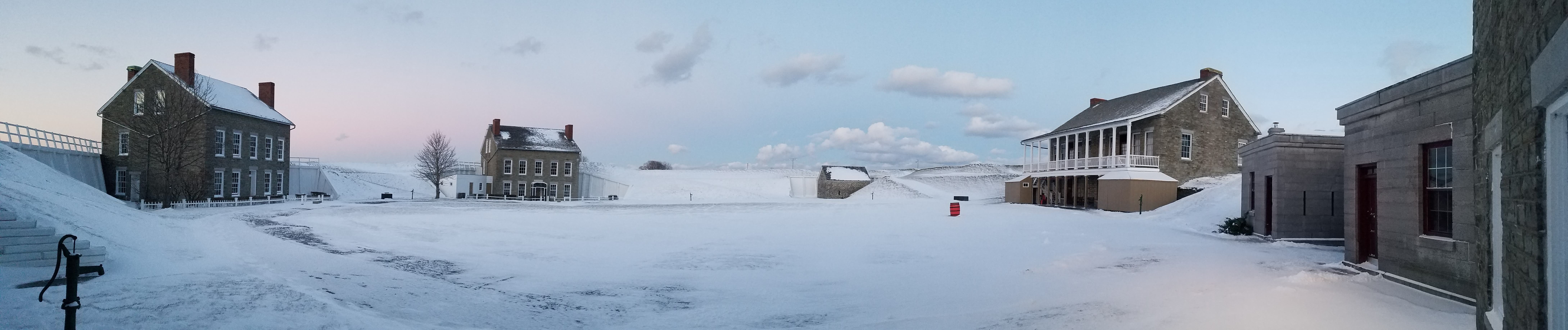
Internal view of Fort Ontario after a fresh snowfall, December 2018.

== See also ==
- List of New York State Historic Sites
