= Film Comment Selects =

Film Comment Selects is an annual program hosted by the Film Society of Lincoln Center and curated by the editors and writers of Film Comment magazine. It aims to provide a cutting-edge lineup of eclectic and international films, many of which have appeared on the international film festival circuit and been championed in the magazine but have yet to gain distribution. The program first appeared as a one-off event in March 2000, organized by editor Richard T. Jameson and showcasing the most significant films and filmmakers of the past decade. Gavin Smith and Kent Jones added three New York premieres to the roster (Lars von Trier’s The Idiots, Manoel de Oliveira’s Inquiétude, Abbas Kiarostami’s The Wind Will Carry Us), and based on its success, it was revived in 2002, remaining an annual event at the Film Society of Lincoln Center ever since. In recent years, the program has extended its focus on little-seen international discoveries to also include avant-garde selections, retrospectives of overlooked or underrated artists, previews of films that are soon to be released, and conversations with directors and actors.

== Past programs ==
=== March 2000 ===
==== Top of the World: Film Comment Magazine Selects the Most Important Films and Filmmakers of the Nineties ====
- Dead Man (Jim Jarmusch, 1995)
- Unforgiven (Clint Eastwood, 1992)
- Red (Krzysztof Kieslowski, 1994)
- JLG/JLG (Jean-Luc Godard, 1995)
- The Puppetmaster (Hou Hsiao-hsien, 1993)
- Schindler's List (Steven Spielberg, 1993)
- Pulp Fiction (Quentin Tarantino, 1994)
- Miller's Crossing (Joel and Ethan Coen, 1990)
- The Age of Innocence (Martin Scorsese, 1993)
- The Idiots (Lars von Trier, 1998)
- Inquiétude (Manoel de Oliveira, 1998)
- The Wind Will Carry Us (Abbas Kiarostami, 1999)

=== Special events ===
- Pink Floyd The Wall (Alan Parker, 1982), followed by prog-rock afterparty with music by the DJs of Viva Radio—October 13, 2009
- The Last Days of Disco (Whit Stillman, 1998), followed by a late disco dance party with DJs Jeremy Campbell (Tropical Computer System) and Dan Selzer (Acute Records)—August 27, 2009
- Thirst (Park Chan-wook, 2009), with Park Chan-wook in person—July 20, 2009
- The Friends of Eddie Coyle (Peter Yates, 1973)—May 26, 2009
- 1991: The Year Punk Broke (Dave Markey, 1992), followed by an after-party with music provided by Viva Radio—May 4, 2009
- A Tribute to Pierre Clémenti; the USA premiere of Les Idoles (Marc’o, 1968)—November 25, 2008
- The Changeling (Peter Medak, 1980)—October 31, 2008
- Che! (Richard Fleischer, 1969)—October 28, 2008
- The Last Winter (Larry Fessenden, 2006)—September 17, 2007
- The Executioner's Song (Lawrence Schiller, 1982), followed by a Q&A with Lawrence Schiller and Rosanna Arquette—August 5, 2007
- Them (David Moreau and Xavier Palud, 2006)—August 2, 2007
- Norman Mailer on Film: Tough Guys Don't Dance (Mailer, 1987) and Maidstone (Mailer, 1971), with Mailer in conversation—July 22, 2007
- Preview screening of Joshua (George Ratliff, 2007), followed by a Q&A with George Ratliff, producer Johnathan Dorfman, and cast members—July 2, 2007
- Hot Fuzz (Edgar Wright, 2007) screened with Electra Glide in Blue (James William Guercio, 1973), with Edgar Wright, Simon Pegg, and Nick Frost in person—April 10, 2007
- An Evening with Charles Grodin, with a screening of Midnight Run (Martin Brest, 1988), followed by an onstage conversation with Charles Grodin—December 13, 2006
- Sneak Preview of The Descent (Neil Marshall, 2005), with Neil Marshall in attendance—July 24, 2006
- Pine Flat (Sharon Lockhart, 2005), with Sharon Lockhart in person—May 25, 2006
- An Evening with Anton Corbijn, Jonathan Glazer, Mark Romanek, and Stéphane Sednaoui (a 90-minute program featuring rare director’s cuts and previously unseen content), featuring all four directors in a roundtable Q&A and Michel Gondry as MC—September 13, 2005
- 2046 (Wong Kar-wai, 2004), with Wong Kar-wai in person—June 15, 2005
- We Jam Econo: The Story of the Minutemen (Tim Irwin, 2005), followed by a Q&A with Tim Irwin and producer Keith Schieron—May 24, 2005

=== 2002 ===
- Martha… Martha (Sandrine Veysset, 2001)
- The Mission (Johnnie To, 1999)
- Investigating Sex (Alan Rudolph, 2001)
- Trouble Every Day (Claire Denis, 2001)
- The Sleepy Time Gal (Christopher Münch, 2001)
- The Piano Teacher (Michael Haneke, 2001)
- The Entity (Sidney J. Furie, 1982) screened with Outer Space (Peter Tscherkassky, 1999) and Dream Work (Peter Tscherkassky, 2001)
- Forever Mine (Paul Schrader, 2000)
- Merci pour le chocolat (Claude Chabrol, 2000)

==== Focus on New Japanese Cinema ====
- Barren Illusion (Kiyoshi Kurosawa, 1999)
- Not Forgotten (Makoto Shinozaki, 2000)
- Ring (Hideo Nakata, 1998)
- Ichi the Killer (Takeshi Miike, 2001)
- H-Story (Nobuhiro Suwa, 2001)
- Pulse (Kiyoshi Kurosawa, 2001)
- Harmful Insect (Akihiko Shiota, 2001)

=== 2003 ===
- 11'09"01 (Samira Makmalbaf, Claude Lelouch, Youssef Chahine, Danis Tanovic, Idriisa Ouedraogo, Ken Loach, Alejandro González Iñárritu, Amos Gitai, Mira Nair, Sean Penn, Shōhei Imamura, 2002)
- Happy Here and Now (Michael Almereyda, 2002)
- demonlover (Olivier Assayas, 2002)
- The Road (Darezhan Omirbaev, 2001)
- Combat d’amour en songe (Raúl Ruiz, 2000)
- Seafood (Zhu Wen, 2001)
- Path to War (John Frankenheimer, 2002)
- Seven Days in May (John Frankenheimer, 1964)
- Two films by Chris Marker and Société pour le lancement des Oeuvres Nouvelles (SLON): The Battle of the Ten Million (1970) and 2084 (1984)
- The Secret Lives of Dentists (Alan Rudolph, 2002)
- La Nouvelle vie (Philippe Grandrieux, 2002)
- Remembrance of Things to Come (Chris Marker and Yannick Bellon, 2002) screened with Embassy (Chris Marker, 1974)
- Ken Park (Larry Clark and Ed Lachman, 2002)
- Blissfully Yours (Apichatpong Weerasethakul, 2001)
- Monrak Transistor (Pen-ek Ratanaruang, 2001)
- Brief Crossing (Catherine Breillat, 2001)
- Shadow Kill (Adoor Gopalakrishnan, 2002)
- JUON:the grudge 2 (Noriko sakai) 2003
- JUON: the grudge (2003)

=== 2004 ===
- Greendale (Bernard Shakey aka Neil Young, 2003)
- All Tomorrow’s Parties (Yu Lik-wai, 2003)
- No Rest for the Brave (Alain Guiraudie, 2003)
- The Grudge (Takashi Shimizu, 2002)
- Los Angeles Plays Itself (Thom Andersen, 2003)
- The World's Greatest Sinner (Timothy Carey, 1962)
- Bright Future (Kiyoshi Kurosawa, 2003)
- Strayed (André Téchiné, 2003)
- The Story of Marie and Julien (Jacques Rivette, 2003)
- The Magic Gloves (Martín Rejtman, 2003)
- Playing “In the Company of Men” (Arnaud Desplechin, 2003)
- Ripley’s Game (Liliana Cavani, 2002)
- Gambling, Gods and LSD (Peter Mettler, 2002)
- Shanghai Picnic (Andrew Cheng, 2001)
- Welcome to Destination Shanghai (Andrew Cheng, 2003)
- The Five Obstructions (Lars von Trier and Jorgen Leth, 2003)

=== 2005 ===
- Oldboy (Park Chan-wook, 2003)
- Clean (Olivier Assayas, 2004)
- At Five in the Afternoon (Samira Makmalbaf, 2003)
- Vital (Shinya Tsukamoto, 2004)
- Downfall (Oliver Hirschbiegel, 2004)
- Izo (Takashi Miike, 2004)
- Le Pont des Arts (Eugene Green, 2004)
- Turtles Can Fly (Bahman Ghobadi, 2004)
- The Ister (David Barison and Daniel Ross, 2004)
- Sympathy for Mr. Vengeance (Park Chan-wook, 2002)
- Secret File (Paolo Benvenuti, 2003)
- Ma mère (Christophe Honoré, 2004)
- Archival prints of Fixed Bayonet (Sam Fuller, 1951) and Steel Helmet (Sam Fuller, 1950)
- Los muertos (Lisandro Alonso, 2004)
- Route 181: Fragments of a Journey in Palestine-Israel (Eyal Sivan and Michel Khlefi, 2004)
- Memories of Murder (Bong Joon-ho, 2003)

==== Bulle Ogier Tribute ====
- The Salamander (Alain Tanner, 1971)
- Le Pont du Nord (Jacques Rivette, 1981)
- Two (Werner Schroeter, 2002)
- Mistress (Barbet Schroder, 1973)
- The Discreet Charm of the Bourgeoisie (Luis Buñuel, 1972)

=== 2006 ===
- Ce Jour-là (Raul Ruiz, 2003)
- Everlasting Regret (Stanley Kwan, 2005)
- Stranded in Canton (William Eggleston, 1974/2005)
- Battle in Heaven (Carlos Reygadas, 2005)
- La Domaine perdu (Raul Ruiz, 2004)
- Shanghai Dreams (Wang Xiaoshuai, 2005)
- One Night (Niki Karimi, 2005)
- Eli, Eli, Lema Sabachtani? (Shinji Aoyama, 2005)
- Diás de Campo (Raul Ruiz, 2004)
- Saratan (Ernest Abdyshaparov, 2005)
- Workingman’s Death (Michael Glawogger, 2005)
- Isolation (Billy O’Brien, 2005)
- Kinetta (Yorgos Lanthimos, 2005)
- Bashing (Masahiro Kobayashi, 2005)
- Digital Short Films by Three Filmmakers: Haze (Shinya Tsukamoto, 2005); Magician(s) (Song Il-gon, 2005); Worldly Desires (Apichatpong Weerasethakul, 2005)
- The Forsaken Land (Vimukthi Jayasundara, 2005)
- Loft (Kiyoshi Kurosawa, 2005)
- Kekexili: Mountain Patrol (Lu Chuan, 2004)

==== Focus on Elaine May ====
- A New Leaf (1971)
- The Heartbreak Kid (1972)
- Mikey and Nicky (1976)
- Ishtar (1987)

=== 2007 ===
- Opening Night: Exterminating Angels (Jean-Claude Brisseau, 2006)
- Closing Night: An Evening with Paul Verhoeven: Black Book (Paul Verhoeven, 2007)
- Bardo (Lin Tay-jou, 2005)
- Colossal Youth (Pedro Costa, 2006)
- Exiled (Johnnie To, 2006)
- James Benning: Two Films: Ten Skies (2004) and 13 Lakes (2004)
- Lights in the Dusk (Aki Kaurismäki, 2006)
- Longing (Valeska Grisebach, 2006)
- Play It as It Lays (Frank Perry, 1972)
- Retribution (Kiyoshi Kurosawa, 2006)
- Summer ’04 (Stefan Krohmer, 2006)
- Summer Palace (Lou Ye, 2006)
- Tachigui: The Amazing Lives of the Fast Food Grifters (Mamoru Oshii, 2006)
- These Encounters of Theirs (Jean-Marie Straub and Danièle Huillet, 2006)
- Twilight's Last Gleaming (Director’s cut, Robert Aldrich, 1977)
- The Wedding Director (Marco Bellocchio, 2006)
- The Yacoubian Building (Marwan Hamed, 2006)

=== 2008 ===
- Opening Night: The Duchess of Langeais (Jacques Rivette, 2007)
- Closing Night: Alex Cox in Person: Walker (Alex Cox, 1987) and Searchers 2.0 (Alex Cox, 2007)
- Special Late Night Preview: George Romero’s Diary of the Dead (George Romero, 2007)
- The Banishment (Andrei Zvyagintsev, 2007)
- Before I Forget (Jacques Nolot, 2007)
- Boarding Gate (Olivier Assayas, 2007)
- Chop Shop (Ramin Bahrani, 2007)
- Container (Lukas Moodysson, 2006)
- Dark Matter (Chen Shi-zheng, 2007)
- Dust (Hartmut Bitomsky, 2007)
- The Edge of Heaven (Faith Akin, 2007)
- Ex Drummer (Koen Mortier, 2007)
- Flash Point (Wilson Yip, 2007)
- Frontière(s) (Xiavier Gens, 2007)
- Import Export (Ulrich Seidl, 2007)
- Inside (Julien Maury and Alexandre Bustillo, 2007)
- Joy Division (Grant Gee, 2007)
- Schindler’s Houses (Heinz Emigholz, 2007)
- Wolfsbergen (Nanouk Leopold, 2007)
- A Wonderful World (Luis Estrada, 2007)

==== Spotlight on Richard Fleischer ====
- Mandingo (1975)
- 10 Rillington Place (1971)

==== Mondo Packard ====
- Reflections of Evil (Damon Packard, 2002)
- Damon Packard’s Greatest Hits: trailers for Apple (1992–1995), Untitled Star Wars Mockumentary (2004), Reflections of Evil (2003), The Early 70’s Horror Trailer (2002); Rollerboogie III (1999); Chad’s Wedding Video; Chemtrails (2005); Al’s Techno Bar (2005); Lost in the Thinking (2005); Dawn of an Evil Millennium (1988)

==== Other special programs ====
- Crispin Glover in person: Rubin and Ed (Trent Harris, 1992)
- A new look at Philippe Garrel: J’entends plus la guitare (Philippe Garrel, 1991)

=== 2009 ===
- Opening Night: Paradise (Michael Almereyda, 2009)
- Closing Night: The Hurt Locker (Kathryn Bigelow, 2008)
- A l’aventure (Jean-Claude Brisseau, 2009)
- Adam Resurrected (Paul Schrader, 2008)
- Better Things (Duane Hopkins, 2008)
- The Chaser (Na Hong-jin, 2008)
- Frontier of Dawn (Philippe Garrel, 2008)
- Jerichow (Christian Petzold, 2008)
- Revanche (Götz Spielmann, 2008)
- The Tiger's Tail (John Boorman, 2006)
- A Week Alone (Celina Murga, 2007)
- A Woman in Berlin (Max Färberböck, 2008)

==== Special Retrospectives ====
- The Killing of Sister George (Robert Aldrich, 1968)
- Ladies and Gentlemen, the Fabulous Stains (Lou Adler, 1981)

==== Double Trouble: Joel DeMott and Jeff Kreines ====
- Demon Lover Diary (Joel DeMott, 1980)
- Seventeen (Joel DeMott and Jeff Kreines, 1983)

==== Guy Debord ====
- In girum imus nocte et consumimur igni (1978)
- The Society of the Spectacle (1973) screened with Réfutation de tous les judgements, tant élogieux qu’hostiles, qui ont été jusq’ici portés sur le film ‘La société du spectacle’ (1975)
- Hurlements en faveur de Sade (1952) screened with On the Passage of a Few Persons Through a Rather Brief Unity of Time (1959) and Critique de la separation (1961)

=== 2010 ===
- Opening Night: Over the Edge (Jonathan Kaplan, 1979)
- Closing Night: The Time That Remains (Elia Suleiman, 2009)
- Accident (Soi Cheang, 2009)
- Air Doll (Hirokazu Kore-eda, 2009)
- Applause (Martin Zandvliet, 2009)
- Be Good (Sois Sage) (Juliette Garcias, 2009)
- A Brighter Summer Day (Edward Yang, 1991)
- Les derniers jours du monde (Happy End) (Arnaud and Jean-Marie Larrieu, 2009)
- Godard Rarities: A choice selection of odds and ends from the extended oeuvre of Jean-Luc Godard, including material from his American escapades and TV appearances, curated with the help of Jake Perlin.
- Kinatay (The Execution of P.) (Brillante Mendoza, 2009)
- The Land of Madness (Luc Moullet, 2009)
- Like You Know It All (Hong Sang-soo, 2009)
- Morphia (Alexei Balabanov, 2008)
- Nucingen House (Raúl Ruiz, 2008)
- Perfect Life (Emily Tang, 2008)
- Persecution (Patrice Chéreau, 2009)
- Survival of the Dead (George A. Romero, 2009)
- Tales from the Golden Age (Cristian Mungiu, Ioana Uricaru, Hanno Höfer, Razvan Marculescu & Constantin Popescu, 2009)
- The Victors (Carl Foreman, 1963)

=== 2011 ===
- Opening Night: Bas-fonds (Isild Le Besco, 2010), I Wish I Knew (Jia Zhangke, 2010)
- Closing Night: Burke & Hare (John Landis, 2010), Insidious (James Wan, 2010)
- Cave of Forgotten Dreams (Werner Herzog, 2010)
- City of Life and Death (Lu Chuan, 2010)
- Domaine (Patric Chiha, 2009)
- El Sicario, Room 164 (Gianfranco Rosi, 2010)
- I Only Want You To Love Me (Rainer Werner Fassbinder, 1991)
- Klaus Kinski: Jesus Christ Savior (Peter Geyer, 2008)
- Robbery (Peter Yates, 1967)
- The Silence (Barab Bo Odar, 2010)
- Sodankyla Forever (Peter Von Bagh, 2010)
- Submarino (Thomas Vinterburg, 2010)
- Charly (Isild Le Besco, 2007)
- Demi-Tariff (Isild Le Besco, 2003)
- The Karski Report (Claude Lanzmann, 2010), with "A Visitor from the Living"
- Sobibor (Claude Lanzmann, 2010)
- Wundkanal (Thomas Harlan, 1984)
- The Velvet Underground in Boston (Andy Warhol, 1967)
- The Velvet Underground and Nico (Andy Warhol, 1966)
- Straight to Hell Returns (Alex Cox, 1987–2011)
- Cold Fish (Sion Sono, 2010)
- I Saw the Devil (Kim Ji-Woon, 2010)
- Legend of the Fist: The Return of Chen Zhen (Andrew Lau, 2010)

=== 2012 ===
- All Watched Over by Machines of Loving Grace (Adam Curtis, 2011)
- Almayer's Folly (Chantal Ackerman, 2011)
- Alps (Yorgos Lanthimos, 2011)
- Altered States (Ken Russell, 1980)
- Despair (Rainer Werner Fassbinder, 1978)
- Face to Face (Ingmar Bergman, 1976)
- Faust (Alexander Sokurov, 2011)
- The Forgiveness of Blood (Joshua Marston, 2011)
- Headhunters (Morten Tyldum, 2011)
- I Wish (Hirokazu Kore-eda, 2011)
- Land Passion War of the Dead Christ Worlds (J. Hoberman)
- Le Sauvage (Jean-Paul Rappeneau, 1975)
- Life is Sweet (Mike Leigh, 1990)
- Man at Sea (Constantine Giannaris, 2011)
- Margaret (Kenneth Lonergan, 2011)
- Mortem (Eric Atlan, 2010)
- My Crasy Life (Jean-Pierre Gorin, 1992)
- My Own Private River (Gus van Sant, 2011)
- Pink Floyd: Live at Pompeii (Adrian Maben, 1971)
- Poto and Cabengo (Jean-Pierre Gorin, 1980)
- Rebellion (Mathieu Kassovitz, 2011)
- Routine Pleasures (Jean-Pierre Gorin, 1986)
- Silent House (Laura Lau, 2011)
- Sleepwalk (Sara Driver, 1986)
- Snowtown (Justin Kurzel, 2011)
- A Stoker (Alexei Balabanov, 2011)
- Target (Alexander Zeldovich, 2011)
- Transfer (Damir Lukacevic, 2010)
- Wanderlust (David Wain, 2012)
- We Have a Pope (Nanni Moretti, 2011)
- Whore's Glory (Michael Glawogger, 2011)

=== 2013 ===
- Opening Night: Simon Killer (Antonio Campos, 2012)
- Closing Night: The We and the I (Michel Gondry, 2012)
- "3" (Pablo Stoll, 2012)
- A Borrowed Life (Wu Nien-jen, 1994)
- Call Girl (Mikael Marcimain, 2012)
- Dormant Beauty (Marco Bellocchio, 2012)
- Electra Glide in Blue (James William Guercio, 1973)
- "From the Life of the Marionettes" (Ingmar Bergman, 1980)
- "Gebo and the Shadow" (Manoel de Oliveira, 2012)
- "Here Comes the Devil" (Adrián García Bogliano, 2011)
- Hearts of the West (Howard Zieff, 1975)
- In the Fog (Sergei Loznitza, 2012)
- Miss Lovely (Ashim Ahluwalia, 2012)
- Motorway (Soi Cheang, 2012)
- Nights with Theodore (Sébastien Betbeder, 2012)
- Penance (Kiyoshi Kurosawa, 2012)
- Sightseers (Ben Wheatley, 2012)
- Slither (Howard Zieff, 1973)
- Stemple Pass (James Benning, 2012)
- Wish You Were Here (Kieran Darcy-Smith, 2012)
- White Epilepsy (Philippe Grandrieux, 1975)

=== 2014 ===
- Opening Night: Me and You (Bernardo Bertolucci, 2012)
- Closing Night: Our Sunhi (Hong Sang-soo, 2013)
- Betrayal (David Jones, 1983)
- Blood Glacier (Marvin Kren, 2013)
- Cannibal (Manuel Martín Cuenca, 2013)
- Cherchez Hortense (Pascal Bonitzer, 2012)
- City of Pirates (Raul Ruiz, 1983)
- Enemy (Denis Villaneuve, 2013)
- Fat Shaker (Mohammad Shirvani, 2013)
- Felony (Matthew Saville, 2013)
- Flesh of My Flesh (Denis Dercourt, 2013)
- The Hypnotist (Lasse Hallström, 2012)
- Intruders (Noh Young-seok, 2013)
- Metro Manila (Sean Ellis, 2013)
- The Sacrament (Ti West, 2013)
- Top of the Lake (James Campion, 2013)
- The Weight (Jeon Kyu-hwan, 2012)

==== Focus on Christian Petzold ====
- Ghosts (Christian Petzold, 2005)
- Wolfsburg (Christian Petzold, 2003)

==== Healthcare Mayhem Double Feature ====
- The Carey Treatment (Blake Edwards, 1972)
- The Hospital (Arthur Hiller, 1971)
