= Beckett Rosset =

American writer and host of literary salons

Beckett Rosset (born 1970) is a writer and host of underground literary artist salons in New York City. His influence on New York City underground culture has been featured in the Sunday edition of The New York Times and The Brooklyn Rail.

Rosset hosted salons from 2022 to 2023. They were hosted out of an eccentric 1920's town house belonging to the former heir of Welche's in the West Village at 422 Hudson Street, prior to the building being sold in 2023. The salons were subsequently moved to various underground locations in lower Manhattan. Rosset's curatorial efforts have championed underground, up-and-coming poets, playwrights, artists and performers including Nico Walker, Christian Lorentzen, Megan Nolan, Ellen Frances, among others.

Rosset is named after author and playwright Samuel Beckett, and is the son of Beckett's legendary publisher Barney Rosset. Beckett Rosset was famously photographed as a child alongside his namesake by Richard Avedon.
