= The Art of Drowning =

- Author: Billy Collins
- Language: English
- Genre: Poetry
- Publisher: University of Pittsburgh Press
- Publication date: June 29, 1995
- Publication place: United States
- Pages: 112
- ISBN: 0822938936

The Art of Drowning is a book of poetry by the American Poet Laureate Billy Collins, first published in 1995. John Updike described the collection as "Lovely poems—lovely in a way almost nobody's since [Theodore] Roethke's are. Limpid, gently and consistently startling, more serious than they seem, they describe all the worlds that are and were and some others besides." The title poem is the 11th poem in the collection, and it describes a man who reflects on the course of his life while he is drowning.

== Contents ==
- Dear Reader
- Consolation
- Osso Buco
- Directions
- Influence
- Water Table
- Reading in a Hammock
- Print
- Sunday Morning with the Sensational Nightingales
- Cheers
- The Best Cigarette
- Metropolis
- Days
- Tuesday, June
- The Art of Drowning
- Canada
- The Biography of a Cloud
- Death Beds
- Conversion
- Horizon
- The City of Tomorrow
- Thesaurus
- Fiftieth Birthday Eve
- On Turning Ten
- Shadow
- Workshop
- Keats's Handwriting
- Budapest
- My Heart
- Romanticism
- Monday Morning
- Dancing Toward Bethlehem
- The First Dream
- Sweet Talk
- Dream
- Man in Space
- Philosophy
- While Eating a Pear
- The End of the World
- Center
- Design
- The Invention of the Saxophone
- Medium
- Driving Myself to a Poetry Reading
- Pinup
- Piano Lessons
- Exploring the Coast of Birdland
- The Blues
- Nightclub
- Some Final Words
