= Sid Laverents =

American filmmaker

- Born: Sidney Nicklas Laverents; August 5, 1908; Cheyenne, Wyoming
- Died: May 6, 2009 (aged 100); Chula Vista, California
- Occupation: Filmmaker
- Known for: Multiple SIDosis; The Sid Saga

Sidney Nicklas Laverents (August 5, 1908 – May 6, 2009) was an American amateur filmmaker and musician, who started making films at home when he was 50. Recognized as one of the industry's most successful hobbyists, his 1970 film Multiple SIDosis is one of the few amateur films to have been selected for inclusion in the National Film Registry.

== Biography ==
Laverents was born on August 5, 1908, in Cheyenne, Wyoming, and moved frequently with his family as his father was a real estate speculator always trying to find the next opportunity, ultimately attending high school in Florida. He learned to play piano from his mother, took drum lessons, and was self-taught on banjo, harmonica and the ukulele. He figured out how to play a woodblock with a string and cymbals with his elbows while playing the banjo or ukulele, and left to become a traveling musician after meeting an act that had performed at a theater his father owned. During the Great Depression, Laverents made a living as a one-man band appearing in vaudeville shows.

He was employed as a sheet metal worker at Consolidated Aircraft in San Diego, California, starting in 1941, and with the exception of military service remained with the firm until 1967, by which time it had become part of Convair. During World War II, he was assigned to repair aircraft in Calcutta for the United States Army Air Forces and he later studied engineering at San Diego State College. After leaving Convair, he worked for Hughes Tool Company until his retirement in 1972.

=== Filmmaking ===
He started making films in 1958 as part of the San Diego Amateur Moviemakers Club using a 16-millimeter Bolex camera. The 20 films he made during his second half-century included nature films such as Snails and How They Walk about snails in his backyard that included a snail race with hand-painted numbers on their shells, as well as It Sudses and Sudses and Sudses, a comedy about shaving cream cans gone crazy. A three-part biography, The Sid Saga, was finished while he was in his 80s.

Laverents was best known for Multiple SIDosis, a nine-minute film that features multiple images of himself playing various instruments to the tune of the Felix Arndt song Nola. The film, which took four years to complete, begins with Laverents opening a Christmas present of tape recorder from his third wife, Adelaide, which he uses to play the song accompanying himself by humming, whistling and playing many of the instruments he had used in his one-man band. With the technology available at the time, he added the additional images of himself by re-exposing the film multiple times to include 11 images of himself using custom-designed equipment that he had developed to ensure that the sound and images were synchronized during the re-recordings. The multiple re-exposures meant that an error on any of the dozen images would require starting from scratch.

At the age of 92, in the year 2000, the National Film Preservation Board of the Library of Congress selected Multiple SIDosis for preservation as part of the National Film Registry, making it one of the small number of amateur films included, joining the unscripted Zapruder film of the John F. Kennedy assassination.

Stephen Leggett of the National Film Preservation Board described the film as "technically quite adept and inventive, amusingly droll and quite mesmerizing to those who see it" and noted that it was chosen to "honor all the many terrific films produced by amateur ciné club filmmakers throughout the U.S. over the years".

=== Personal ===
Sid became a member of MENSA later in his life, after reading an article about it in the Reader's Digest, and remembering that an IQ test given to him in the 1940s for a job in the defense industry was the highest recorded.

In addition to his films, Laverents wrote two books; His autobiography, The First 90 Years Are the Hardest and the novel Raging Waters about a devastating 1929 flood in Elba, Alabama.

Worried that his health might prevent him from attending a party celebrating his 100th birthday, he prepared an apology video in advance, but was ultimately able to attend.

Laverents lived in Bonita, California, and died at age 100 on May 6, 2009, in Chula Vista, California, due to pneumonia. He was married four times; his first two marriages ended in divorce, and then he was widowed once. He was survived by his fourth wife, Charlotte, whom he married in 1991.

== Legacy ==
Two videos on YouTube were made by artists who expressed their inspiration from "Multiple SIDosis" for their work. These include "chronic.robotosis" by Roger Pellegrini, and the video for the song "Never Alone" by Low Water.
