= Safe Haven Holocaust Refugee Shelter Museum =

Museum in Oswego, New York, United States

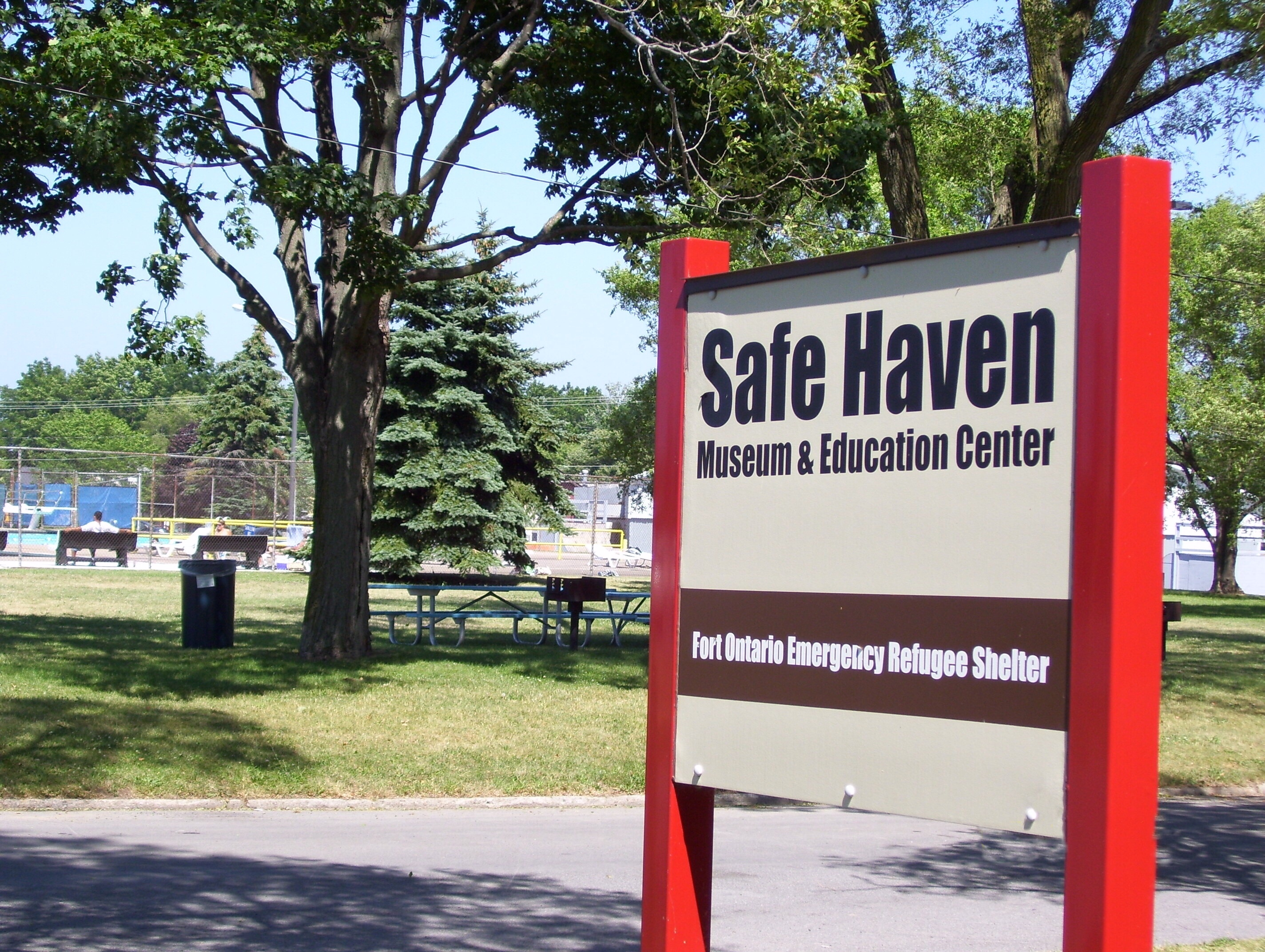

- Location within New York Safe Haven Holocaust Refugee Shelter Museum (the United States)
- Established: 2002
- Location: 2 East 7th Street, Oswego, New York
- Coordinates: 43.462372°N 76.503194°W
- Website: www.safehavenmuseum.com

The Safe Haven Holocaust Refugee Shelter Museum (previously called the Safe Haven Museum and Education Center) is a museum in Oswego, New York, that tells the story of 982 mainly Jewish refugees who fled Europe in the U.S. government "Safe Haven" program. They came to the Fort Ontario Emergency Refugee Shelter in Oswego, New York, in August 1944.

Safe Haven was the only official U.S. government activity to rescue Jewish refugees during the Second World War, for victims of the Holocaust. The refugees were brought from Italy, but deliberately only from other parts of Europe. They were all fleeing from the Nazis. They were deliberately chosen so that some incoming refugees were non-Jewish, so as to allay antisemitic fears.

They were placed in Fort Ontario, behind barbed wire, and given no official status, and were told they would be returned to their homelands after the war, and would have no rights as regards entering the United States. Due to political pressure, at the war's end they were allowed to stay in the United States.
