= Mortem (film) =

2010 French film

- Directed by: Eric Atlan
- Written by: Eric Atlan; Marie-Claude Dazun
- Starring: Daria Panchenko; Diana Rudychenko; Stany Coppet; Hortense Gelinet; Sophie Gelinet; Jean-Luc Masson
- Production companies: Rainbow Melodies; Artistic Finances; Capson; Swap; Sylicone; Transpalux
- Distributed by: New Distributors Association (France); R-Squared Films (United States and Canada); Digital Media Rights (United States); BigStar.tv (United States)
- Release date: 2010
- Running time: 94 minutes
- Country: France
- Language: French

Mortem is a French experimental film directed by Eric Atlan and first screened at the Oaxaca International Film Festival in 2010 before receiving a limited theatrical release in 2012. Reminiscent of Persona and Mulholland Drive, the film follows a young woman who defies her own death.

== Reception ==
Mortem generally received mixed to negative reviews from critics. The Village Voice stated that "The initial scenes, thick with creep-show ambiance, promise more fulfilling madness than what actually transpires once the out-of-nowhere second guest reveals who she is." The New York Times compared the film's aesthetic to that of Jean Cocteau, but gave a similarly lukewarm review as The Village Voice, stating that "Most often Mortem just lacks bite, and the dedicated leads seem at times a little slight for the staging of a struggle at eternity's edge." Time Out New York awarded the film one star out of five and described it as "excruciatingly bad". Slant Magazine gave the film a largely negative review, opining that the film "too readily abandons its noir framework for the sweeping meta-narrative about desire's link to thanatos, and in so doing, leaves too little room for guesswork." Film Journal International stated that "This initially bewitching throwback to the French New Wave and Cocteau turns into a turgid and frequently laughable pseudo-philosophical locked-room argument between a woman and her soul."
