= Barney Rosset =

American publisher (1922–2012)

- Born: Barnet Lee Rosset, Jr. May 28, 1922; Chicago, Illinois, U.S.
- Died: February 21, 2012 (aged 89); New York City, U.S.
- Occupations: Book, magazine publisher
- Known for: Some of the 20th century's most important writing
- Notable work: The legal publication of Lady Chatterley's Lover and the Tropic of Cancer
- Spouse(s): Joan Mitchell, Hannelore Eckert, Cristina Agnini, Lisa Krug, Astrid Myers
- Children: 4
- Website: Grove Press and Evergreen Review

Barnet Lee "Barney" Rosset, Jr. (May 28, 1922 – February 21, 2012) was a pioneering American book and magazine publisher. An avant-garde taste maker, he purchased Grove Press in 1951, and founded The Evergreen Review in 1957, both of which gave him platforms for curating world-class and, in several cases, Nobel prize-winning work by authors including Samuel Beckett (1969), Pablo Neruda (1971), Octavio Paz (1990), Kenzaburō Ōe (1994) and Harold Pinter (2005).

A reader and an editor, Rosset was the first to publish Beat poets Jack Kerouac, William S. Burroughs and Allen Ginsberg, a who's who of playwrights including Tom Stoppard and Harold Pinter, political biographies like Alex Haley's The Autobiography of Malcolm X, erotic literature like the Story of O, groundbreaking gay fiction by Jean Genet, and banned classics such as Henry Miller's Tropic of Cancer and D. H. Lawrence's Lady Chatterley's Lover.

Rosset's insistence on publishing "banned" books permanently redefined American obscenity law. "To do Lady Chatterley's Lover before Tropic of Cancer would be more acceptable because D.H. Lawrence was a famous writer and revered at many levels," Rosset said in 2009, explaining his tactical reasoning after the fact. "Lady Chatterley would be more feasible to make a battle plan for, and we did exactly that," starting with an uncensored version of Lady Chatterley's Lover, thirty years after its initial U.K. publication. After his first victory, Rosset moved on to the second, waging another legal battle to publish Miller's Tropic of Cancer. In 1964, the Supreme Court affirmed Rosset's right to publish Miller's book. France later inducted him as a Commandeur dans l'Ordre des Arts et des Lettres to honor his contributions to American and world literature; the Norman Mailer Prize was given to him for his work as a "Distinguished Publisher" and the National Coalition Against Censorship recognized him for his contributions to free speech.

== Grove Press ==
=== Cultural impact ===
In 1951, Rosset purchased Grove Press from editor Robert Phelps. As a publisher, Rosset's taste was sophisticated, multicultural, experimental and literary. As a brand, Grove focused on avant-garde literature, radical politics and erotica. In an interview with Tin House publisher Win McCormack, Rosset described what spurred him to publish Beckett:

[O]ne day I read in The New York Times about a play called Waiting for Godot that was going on in Paris. It was a small clip, but it made me very interested. I got hold of it and read it in the French edition. It had something to say to me. Oddly enough, it had a sense of desolation, like Miller, though in its language, its lack of verbiage, it was the opposite of Miller. Still, the sense of a very contemporary lost soul was compelling. I got Wallace Fowlie to read it.... He read the play and told me that he thought — and this before anybody had really heard about it much — that it would be one of the most important works of the 20th Century.

=== Legal impact ===
In 1959, Rosset published D.H. Lawrence's 1928 novel Lady Chatterley's Lover, which the United States had banned in 1929, on the grounds of obscenity. After the book was released, the U.S. Post Office began confiscating copies sent through the mail, which led Grove Press to take legal action — and win. Emboldened, Rosset subsequently decided to publish Henry Miller's Tropic of Cancer, which was first published in France in 1934, and immediately banned by the U.S. Customs Service from being imported into the U.S., again, on grounds of obscenity. So in 1961, Rosset published it. "[L]awsuits were immediately filed against him and booksellers that chose to carry the controversial novel. The trial eventually went all the way to the Supreme Court, which ultimately ruled in Rosset's favor."

In an interview with the Brooklyn Rail, Rosset described the courtroom experience:

[H]e [Miller] wouldn't go to the court.... He'd been summonsed so he was breaking the law by not going. So we went into court, and the District Attorney questioned me and said, "You see that we have a jury here of men and women with children who go to school right near where that book is on sale, near the subway stop. What'd you think they feel to have their children reading this book?" So I took out the book and started reading and the jury started laughing and they thought it was wonderful. I said to them, "If your children got this book and read the whole book you ought to congratulate them." And they loved it, and they refused to convict me of anything.

== The Evergreen Review ==
Launched in 1957, The Evergreen Review also pushed the limits of censorship, impacting the culture at large by inspiring younger Americans to embrace the counterculture. Grove Press published Beat Generation writers, including William Burroughs, Allen Ginsberg, Lawrence Ferlinghetti, John Rechy, Hubert Selby, Jr. and Jack Kerouac. Rosset also purchased the American distribution rights to the Swedish film I Am Curious (Yellow), which had also briefly been banned in Boston, and later found not to be obscene in a Second Circuit Ruling. The Review shuttered in 1984, only to relaunch in 1998 online and under Rosset's management.

One thing I like about this new form of communication [online] is that you can have an article about, say, the 1968 Democratic convention in Chicago like any magazine, but you can also listen to the kind of music they were playing at the time. We can go into new realms of discourse.... They say there's still not enough memory for things like sound and visuals on the Internet, and it costs too much to put a magazine on-line. But that's all going to change fast. To get some idea of how fast, all you have to do is go to Bangkok and see all the poor people selling melons on the streets; and they all have cellular phones.

In 2013, soon after Rosset's death, The Evergreen Review ceased publication, only to be revived in 2017 under the management of John Oakes who got his start in publishing in 1987 as an assistant editor at Barney Rosset's Grove Press. The magazine, which also has a publishing arm called Foxrock Books "builds on Rosset’s legacy of searching out the stories that aren't being told or aren’t being heard: stories that challenge our sensibilities and expand our understanding of the way people actually live in the world, and the way their truths can be expressed."

== Background ==
Born and raised in Chicago to a well-to-do Jewish father, also named Barney, who owned a bank, and an Irish Catholic mother, Mary (née Tansey), Rosset attended the progressive Francis Parker School, where he was best friends with Haskell Wexler who went on to become a renowned cinematographer. According to Rosset, Robert Morss Lovett, the grandfather of Rosset's high school sweetheart, and professor of English at the University of Chicago, was also a great influence on him.

Rosset attended Swarthmore College for one year before enlisting in the army in 1942. It was there that he first discovered the work of Henry Miller. During World War II, Rosset served in the Army Signal Corps as an officer in a photographic company stationed in Kunming, China. In 2002, more than 60 years later, Rosset collected some of his wartime photography for a NYC gallery exhibit that included graphic photos of wounded and dead Chiang Kai-shek soldiers.

In 1949, Rosset married Abstract Expressionist painter Joan Mitchell, and settled in Greenwich Village. Although Rosset's initial ambition was to be a filmmaker like his childhood friend Haskell Wexler, the documentary he produced called Strange Victory about racism in post-World War II America, failed commercially. After his divorce from Mitchell, Rosset took courses at the New School for Social Research where he earned a second B.A. (after his first, from the University of Chicago), and worked for Monthly Review Press magazine. A friend of Mitchell's told Rosset about Grove Press and that the original founders wanted to sell. Rosset purchased it in 1951 for three thousand dollars, and served as publisher until 1985 when he sold the press to Wheatland Corporation operated by Ann Getty and George Weidenfeld.

Rosset was married five times. His second wife, Loly Eckert, was a sales manager at Grove Press, and together they had a son named Peter. Rosset went on to have three more children: a son Beckett Rosset (named for Samuel Beckett) and Tansey and Chantal, daughter of Barney and his then-wife Grove Press editor Lisa Krug, who worked for the Press for 10 years until 1986. Rosset died after a double heart valve replacement in 2012, and his fifth wife, Astrid Meyers, whom he married in 2007, and also a former managing editor of Evergreen Review, survives him.

== Awards ==
- In 1999, Rosset was awarded the French title Commandeur dans l'Ordre des Arts et des Lettres.
- On October 21, 2008, Rosset was honored by the National Coalition Against Censorship for his work defending free expression.
- On November 19, 2008, Rosset received the lifetime achievement Literarian Award from the National Book Foundation in honor of his contributions to American publishing.
- In 2012, he was awarded the Norman Mailer Prize for "Distinguished Publisher."

== Filmography ==
- "Obscene" is a documentary feature about Rosset by Neil Ortenberg and Daniel O'Connor that was released September 26, 2008. The film was a selection of the 2007 Toronto International Film Festival. Features commentary by Amiri Baraka, Lenny Bruce, William S. Burroughs, Jim Carroll, Elsa Dorfman, Lawrence Ferlinghetti, Allen Ginsberg, Al Goldstein, Erica Jong, Ray Manzarek, Michael McClure, Henry Miller, John Rechy, Ed Sanders, Floyd Salas, John Sayles, Gore Vidal, John Waters and Malcolm X.
- ''Barney's Wall: A Portrait of a Game Changer'' is a documentary produced by FoxHog Productions and Rosset's widow Astrid Myers. It tells a story about a painting that Rosset was painting on the walls of their apartment, which his wife had to move after Rosset's death when she had to relocate.

== Bibliography ==
- Briggs, Joe Bob. Profoundly Erotic: Sexy Movies that Changed History ISBN 0-7893-1314-6
- Glass, Loren. Counterculture Colophon: Grove Press, the Evergreen Review, and the Incorporation of the Avant-Garde. Stanford: Stanford University Press, 2013. ISBN 978-0804784160
- Halter, Ed, and B. Rosset, From the Third Eye: The Evergreen Review Film Reader, New York: Seven Stories Press, 2018. ISBN 1609806158
- Review of Contemporary Fiction, Vol. X, no. 3, fall 1990, "Grove Press Issue."
- Rosset, Barney. Rosset: My Life in Publishing and How I Fought Censorship. New York: OR Books, 2017. ISBN 1944869042
- Rosenthal, Michael. "Barney: Grove Press and Barney Rosset" New York: Arcade Publishing, 2017. ISBM 978-1628726503
