= What Where =

1983 play by Samuel Beckett

What Where is Samuel Beckett's last play produced following a request for a new work for the 1983 Autumn Festival in Graz, Austria. It was written between February and March 1983 initially in French as Quoi où and translated by Beckett himself.

== Synopsis ==
The play begins with a voice issuing forth from a dimly lit megaphone: "We are the last five." Only four characters appear throughout the performance however, Bam, Bom, Bim, and Bem (an echo of Rimbaud's sonnet, "Voyelles") but the voice does not belong to a putative Bum, rather it is the "Voice of Bam". The men are all dressed in identical grey gowns with the same long grey hair.

Before the drama proper commences there is a quick run through of the action without words. The four characters enter and exit, as they will all do later, in a style more reminiscent of Quad than the two Act Without Words mimes. Satisfied with this the Voice of Bam says, "Good," switches off the light and prepares us for the action.

The play follows a seasonal pattern. The voice tells us that it is spring and turns on the light. Bom enters from the north and is questioned by Bam as to the results of an interrogation. We do not learn who has been subjected to his ministrations – the assumption is Bum – only that he was given "the works", that he "wept", "screamed" and although he "[b]egged for mercy" he still refused to "say anything".

The voice is dissatisfied with how this scene is playing out and makes them start again. This time Bam asks whether Bom got the man to "say it" and then wants to know if Bom attempted to revive the man. Bom claims that he couldn't at which point Bam accuses him of lying saying that he had been given the information and he would also be subjected to the same grilling until he confessed.

Bim appears and asks what information he needs to extract from Bom. Bam maintains he only wants to know: "That he said it to him." Bim wants to make sure that is all he needs to obtain and then he can stop. Bam tells him, "Yes." Bam's voice repeats "not good, I start again". Bim then asks what is he to confess. Bam tells him that he needs to confess that he said "it" to him. Bim asks if that is all and Bam says "and what". Bim asks again and Bam says yes. Bim then calls Bom to come with him and they both exit.

The same scene is now replayed only it is summer. The Voice of Bam tells us that time has passed but no effort is made to visually convey this fact; it is simply stated. Bim reappears and is questioned. Bam wants to know if he said "it" but the voice is again unhappy and makes them start again. This time Bim is asked if he managed to find out "where" from Bom which he had not as he had not been asked to. In the end Bem appears and is told to find out "where" from Bim. Bem and Bim both exit like before.

We are again informed that time has passed. It is now autumn and Bem returns to report he has been unable to extract "where" from Bim. The voice no longer needs to hear the complete interchange and jumps to Bam accusing Bim of lying and threatening him with "the works". Since there is no one left to carry out his orders Bam escorts Bem away himself.

The voice tells us that winter has now arrived. Bam appears from the west and waits with his head bowed. There is no one left to ask if he got the information or to accuse him of lying if he has proven as unsuccessful as the others.

The voice tells us that he is alone now, "[i]n the present as were I still." There are no more journeys to make and nothing to do apart from let time pass. He leaves the audience to try to make sense of things on their own and switches the light off.

== Sources of inspiration ==
=== Bim and Bom ===
Just as Beckett has a fondness for characters whose names begin with M, there are also a host of characters whose names end with an M.

From the time of his collection of stories More Pricks Than Kicks Bim and Bom appear periodically in Beckett's work. These were Russian clowns of the 1920s and '30s, who for a while were granted permission by the Soviet authorities to satirize the shortcomings of the state. There is a Wikipedia article on Bim Bom which treats the Russian clowns as if they were an individual. as does the issue dated 30 April 1956. The Faber Companion to Samuel Beckett has an entry for "Bim and Bom" (p 56) which also refers to them in the plural. James Knowlson in his biography of Beckett, Damned to Fame, suggests that the names may echo Richard Aldington's Enter Bim and Bom, the epilogue to his 1931 novel The Colonel's Daughter, on an English football field to comment upon the degeneration of English society and "became for Beckett emblems of human cruelty, disguised under a comic garb." They first appear in the short story Yellow, then in Murphy (along with Bum), in draft passages deleted from Waiting for Godot and Endgame, Bom and Bem pop up in How It Is before finally bowing out in What Where.

=== Schubert ===
"Beckett adored Franz Schubert's song cycle, Winterreise (Winter Journey) … [and ] used to listen spellbound to Dietrich Fischer-Dieskau's stunning recording of the songs … He also knew about his connections with the town of Graz [Schubert had stayed there for a time] … In the Schubert Lieder, the traveller in the opening poem, Gute Nacht (Good Night) has lost his love and journeys disconsolately from May into snowy winter … [This] provided Beckett with the formal structure of his play, moving from spring to winter … suggesting death."

=== Thomas Moore ===
In his notes for the German TV production, Beckett wrote "'For PA [i.e. playing area] the light of other days'. And he admitted that he expressly associated this play with Thomas Moore's poignant poem, Oft, in the Stilly Night, which includes the lines 'Sad memory brings the light / Of other days around me'."

=== James Joyce ===
Earlier in his career, Beckett—a disciple of Joyce in his younger days—had previously contributed the essay, "Dante...Bruno.Vico..Joyce" in the critical anthology, Our Exagmination Round His Factification for Incamination of Work in Progress, a work meant to prepare the reading public for what would be the final phase in Joyce's writing.

It is possible that Beckett may have been inspired to name his characters from the sixth verse of the so-called "Ballad of Humpty Dumpty" in Finnegans Wake:

So snug he was in his hotel premises sumptuous
But soon we'll bonfire all his trash, tricks and trumpery
And'tis short till sheriff Clancy'll be winding up his unlimited company
With the bailiff's bom at the door,
(Chorus) Bimbam at the door.
Then he'll bum no more.

Notice that, just as "Bum" is the only unspoken name in Beckett's "last five," so too is "Bem" the only vowel variant missing from Joyce's wordplay. More importantly, however, is the context that Joyce's combination of "bom," "Bimbam," and "bum" suggest. The percussive "bailiff's bom at the door," immediately followed by "Bimbam at the door," all suggest physical intimidation by agents of the state—something which could only have informed Beckett's choice in naming his characters, even if Joyce's work was not his only source of inspiration.

== Interpretation ==
As with many of Beckett's later works for the stage and television, one definitive interpretation of What Where has proven elusive. A clear totalitarian edge exists which is why many opt for a political reading but, as with Catastrophe before it, there is more going on here. It can also be interpreted as a portrait of a single consciousness engaged in a self-reflective act. When the Voice of Bam wants the action to restart, rather than instruct the two player to "Start again," it says – significantly – "I start again" suggesting that the words and actions of the two men are being directly controlled, remembered or imagined by the consciousness behind the voice, presumably the Bam as he is in the present.

A political reading cannot be simply dismissed though since Beckett himself "briefly entertained making each character wear a tarboosh, fezlike headgear associated with Armenians." Even today "[t]orture and ill-treatment in police custody remain widespread in Armenia. Torture usually occurs in pre-trial detention with the aim of coercing a confession or evidence against third parties."

Beckett is famously reported as saying of What Where: "I don't know what it means. Don't ask me what it means. It's an object." There is clearly a danger in taking this remark at face value. Beckett undoubtedly had something quite specific in mind as can be seen in the way he moulded his vision over the three productions in America, Germany and France detailed below. One significant remark he did make was that the Voice of Bam could be thought as coming from "beyond the grave".

Beckett, in Proust, calls memory "some miracle of analogy;" he qualifies it in the preceding phrase as "an accident". The inability to remember, to get at the truth, is a focal point in much of his work. Beckett's characters (e.g. May in Footfalls, Mouth in Not I) seem doomed to repeat themselves, as much as the accidents or miracles of analogy allow them some momentary insight into their situations. For Beckett, memory is second-hand knowledge. You were not there. Another "you" was. Can you trust what he says he saw and heard?

This would not be the first time Beckett has fragmented an individual for dramatic effect (e.g. That Time or Ohio Impromptu). Beckett believes people to be in a continual state of flux, often finding it hard to relate to earlier versions of their own selves (e.g. Krapp: Just been listening to that stupid bastard I took myself for thirty years ago, hard to believe I was ever as bad as that.). With each passing day "we are other", Beckett notes in his monograph, "no longer what we were before the calamity of yesterday." Bam is not wallowing in nostalgia though (like the women in Come and Go), rather he is trying to remember something – an "it", a "when", a "where" – that insists on remaining just out of reach.

Those "familiar with his preoccupation, themes, images, figures of speech … may assume that the 'what where' question is a kind of Oedipus' riddle and that the answer to it cannot be found, despite an obligation to ask the question." Rather than simply "What?" and "Where?" the full questions could easily be: "What is the meaning of life?" and "Where does it all come from?"

If Bam is trying to ascertain the details surrounding a particular crime, the question has to be asked: what crime? James Knowlson believes "that crime appears likely to be Calderón's 'original sin of being born', which Beckett had evoked at the beginning of his career in this essay Proust. Consequently, the overall perpetrator is unlikely ever to be known, let alone apprehended."

== Production history ==
Beckett was not happy with the piece when first completed. He wrote to Kay Boyle in March 1983: "Just finished a short piece – theatre – for the Graz autumn festival, to my dissatisfaction." As had become his working practice, he refined it in rehearsals over several years until he was better pleased with the result. For example, many of the changes television made possible were then adopted back into the stage version.

=== 1983 ===
"The first production of the play at the Harold Clurman Theatre, New York on 15 June 1983 directed by Alan Schneider, was (naturally) totally faithful to Beckett’s text. The play seemed surprisingly long and showed real 'longueurs' not only in the production but also in the text." "[It] arrived at the last minute when the first two plays were already in rehearsal [having] been hastily translated by the author to finish off Alan Schneider's evening."

"Reviewers … tended to concentrate almost exclusively on the play’s possible political resonance. Alan Schneider, commenting on this, wrote to Beckett: ‘What Where most people keep wanting to interpret on the literal political level – I think it may suffer from coming after Catastrophe.’"

=== 1985 ===
In December 1983 Beckett planned to go to Stuttgart to direct the German version Was Wo. Due to ill health the project ended up being postponed. The filming finally took place at the studios of Süddeutscher Rundfunk between 18 and 25 June 1985. "This was to be his last trip abroad." The work was transmitted on 13 June 1986.

"The production was a dramatic distillation and transformation of the original, effectively a recreation." Eric Brater contends that "On screen Beckett more clearly establishes that this is a story about Bam remembering … Torture becomes more explicitly self-inflicted, a function of memory, remorse and the relentless need to tell a story."

"Instead of players in long gray gowns, their own corporeality suspect, the four figures of the revised, television What Where now appeared as floating faces dissolving in and out [of the light] … Neither representation of Bam then is corporeal, Beckett representing instead a spectre and its mirror reflection, and the rest of the figures of What Where are ghosts as well, all the more so as they are represented by the patterns of dots on the television screen. What characters, what bodies, finally exist in What Where are created by voice, less absent presences than present absences."

Beckett referred to the lit playing area in this production as the "field of memory". "The clear indication is that what we are seeing is both a memory and a scenario: instructions come from the megaphone, the Voice of Bam controls what we see, puts the characters through their movements rapidly without words like a film running over its spools at rewind speed, and then starts again, occasionally stopping when Bam is not satisfied and a phrase is improved to add to the force of the theme. [The play can therefore be compared with Krapp’s Last Tape but it also] shares many similarities with Ohio Impromptu, the identical characters in appearance and dress, the unwinding backwards of events and the stylization of image and movement in particular." With Krapp his memories have a certain degree of reliability. Not so with Bam. "[T]he figures in What Where emerge from beyond the grave, ghosts of memories that never really were." They are given form as if they existed.

"In this version the difference between the two Bams was achieved mechanically." "There was a slightly higher frequency in [the voice] of the younger Bam, and a lower deeper effect in the older Bam." "'In his Stuggart notebook Beckett wrote that "S (Stimme [Voice]) = mirror reflection of Bam’s face … S’s voice prerecorded. Bam’s but changed.' This enlarged and distorted death mask ... replaced the suspended 'megaphone at head level' of the original publication." The altered voices of Bam creates, as Walter Asmus suggests, "the ghost Bam, dead Bam, [a] distorted image of a face in a grave, somewhere not in this world any longer, imagining that he comes back to life in the world, dreaming and seeing himself as a … face on the screen." "Jim Lewis, the cameraman with whom Beckett worked on the German TV production ... suggested that at least with regard to 'V' – 'Voice of Bam' it is a matter of being beyond death as this represents, 'The image of Bam in the beyond or beyond the grave or whatever you want to call it'". The stage Bam is therefore an "historical projection" of the incorporeal voice emanating from the loudspeaker.

"The original play had a substantial emphasis on eliciting 'where' from the victims, even where the victim said 'where'. Beckett ... eliminated that potentially confusing repetition, substituting a balanced 'He didn’t say what?’ 'He didn't say where?’ into each encounter. The emphasis on 'where' was decreased, many changed to 'it' and each 'where' followed by a 'what'."

=== 1986 ===
"The [German] television play showed three characters who simply appear and disappear instead of shuffling back and forth on stage, which took a long time. Considering the original printed text not successful, following the clearly superior television piece, Beckett sought with [the director Pierre] Chabert to find a stage equivalent. While Beckett was convinced it could not be done, Chabert proposed to accomplish the appearance/disappearance of the characters with lighting. Beckett agreed to go along with it."

The six performances took place at the Théâtre du Rond-Point in Paris and featured David Warrilow as Bam. The revised text (known as What Where II) did away with the opening mime, Bam's interventions and the characters were again represented only as floating heads. "Je recommence" (I start again) was amended to "Ici Bam" (Here is Bam). "Because of technical difficulties, the French stage production replaced the enlarged and distorted reflection of Bam’s face with a halo, a ring of diffuse orange light. Chabert’s production note is as follows: ‘rond lumineux = source de Voix,’" Additionally, "[i]n place of the cowl-covered heads that created the impression of floating faces, Beckett substituted shaved skulls. The field of memory was now implicit ... On the stage the players appeared unrealistically high standing on a concealed two-foot platform, their heads aligned with the pulsing light that echoed the TV tube."

=== 1988 ===
In 1987 Beckett worked with Stan Gontarski and John Reilly to refine the production, filmed at the Magic Theater in San Francisco, for American television. It has been released by Global Village Video as Peephole Art: Beckett for Television. The four characters are portrayed by Morgan Upton, Tom Luce, Dave Peichart and Richard Wagner. Beckett had been not quite satisfied with the French stage production and re-introduced the "cowl-covered heads replacing the skulls [and also asked that] the light somehow [take] on the image of Bam (but not, he emphasised, televised)." The opening mime was also reinstated. As with the German television production the Voice of Bam was now represented as an eerily distorted face, hovering in the upper left corner of a dark screen. The Modern Word website describes it "like a living, concave mask. His voice is sepulchral and chilling, yet conveys a sad, lonely quality as well. Bam, Bom, Bim, and Bem appear as detached faces along the bottom of the screen, floating in the black void and illuminated in stark white contrast. The dialogue is delivered in brisk, metallic monotones, emphasizing the sameness of the characters and the repetitiveness of the seasonal interrogations."

=== 1999 ===
Damien O’Donnell directed a filmed version of What Where for the Beckett on Film project in December 1999. It was filmed at Ardmore Studios in County Wicklow, Ireland. Bam is played and voiced by Sean McGinley. Gary Lewis plays all other characters and the original text and stage instructions are used including the opening mime. O'Donnell sets the play within a claustrophobic, high-tech library, its tall shelves bordered by strips of fluorescent lighting. When the Voice of Bam declares, "I switch on," the luminescent tubes stutter awake to the sound of breakers being thrown. The voice itself is dispassionate and calm; issuing from a megaphone-shaped loudspeaker fixed above the central doors, it evokes HAL 9000 from the film 2001: A Space Odyssey. The metal clanging of doors and the crisp footsteps on the metallic floor accentuate the chilly atmosphere.

O'Donnell said in interview: "[T]here is no set in the original play, but I argued that the whole play is about power and the abuse of power, and how information is power, so we used the library as a metaphor for somebody who has control of all the power and all the information. When it came to casting, I was looking for a particular type of actor – somebody who could bring a sort of menacing quality to the screen. There is a lot of menace in the play. What Where is about a brooding, palpable evil, which is a theme that occurs in Beckett's other work."

Presented thus is it easy to see What Where as Beckett's Nineteen Eighty-Four. At the end of Catastrophe there is a flicker of hope. Not so here. Just as Winston Smith is beaten into submission so are these characters. O’Donnell brings "the scene closer to realism and create[s] a dark, sinister atmosphere by homing in on the faces of the two actors … As he said, 'Filming allows you to show a close-up of a terrified man, bringing a different edge to the work.'"

Before switching off for the last time Bam's voice instructs the audience: "Make sense who may" but how do you make sense out of something senseless? And is any adjective used more often to describe violence? Beckett has left it up to the viewer to supply his own meaning.

== Adaptations ==
The play has been adapted as a one-act chamber opera by Heinz Holliger, composed in 1988 and first released on a commercial recording in 1997.
