= Krapp's Last Tape =

1958 Irish theatrical play by Samuel Beckett

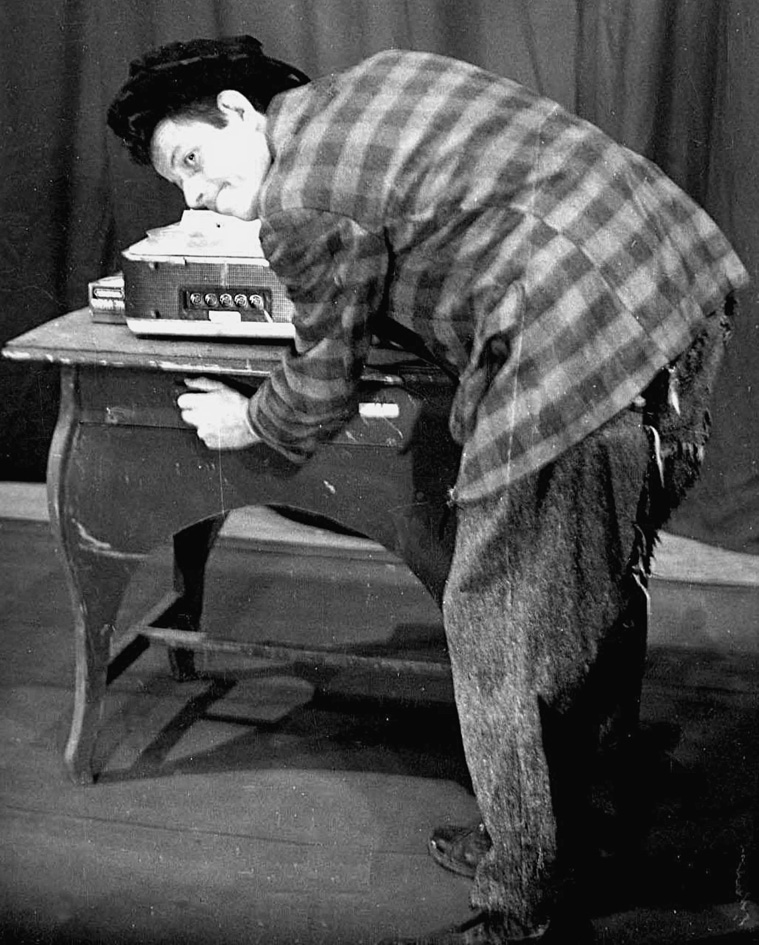
- Bore Angelovski as Krapp
- Original language: English
- Written by: Samuel Beckett
- Characters: Krapp
- Genre: Theater of the Absurd; Tragicomedy
- Setting: Krapp's den

Premiere
- Date: 28 October 1958
- Place: Royal Court Theatre, London

Krapp's Last Tape is a 1958 one-act play, in English, by Samuel Beckett. With a cast of one man, it was written for an Irish actor Patrick Magee and first titled "Magee monologue". It was inspired by Beckett's experience of listening to Magee reading extracts from Molloy and From an Abandoned Work on the BBC Third Programme in December 1957.

It is considered to be among Beckett’s major dramas.

== History ==
=== First publication ===
In a letter to a London bookseller Jake Schwartz on 15 March 1958, Beckett wrote that he had "'four states, in typescript, with copious notes and dirty corrections, of a short stage monologue I have just written (in English) for Pat Magee. This was composed on the machine from a tangle of old notes, so I have not the MS to offer you."

According to Ackerley and Gontarski, "It was first published in Evergreen Review 2.5 (summer 1958), then in Krapp's Last Tape and Embers (Faber, 1959), and Krapp's Last Tape and Other Dramatic Pieces (Grove, 1960)." Beckett’s own translation of the play into French, La Dernière Bande, was published in Les Lettres Nouvelles on 4 March 1959.

The available printed texts must not be taken as definitive. "By the mid-1950s Beckett was already talking and working like a director. In a letter to Rosset's editorial assistant, Judith Schmidt, on 11 May 1959, Beckett referred to the staging of Krapp's Last Tape as its 'creation'," and he made numerous significant changes to the text over the years as he was involved in directing the play.

=== Others ===
The first German performance, on 28 September 1959, was directed by Walter Henn at Berlin's Schillertheater, where 10 years later, on 5 October 1969, Samuel Beckett himself staged his text in a most successful performance (with Martin Held as Krapp).

The first American performance, on 14 January 1960, was directed by Alan Schneider and starred Donald Davis.

== Synopsis ==
The curtain rises on a "late evening in the future." Krapp, an old man, is sitting in his den in the dark, lit by a light above his desk. On his desk are a tape recorder and a number of tins containing reels of recorded tape. He reads aloud from a ledger to find a certain tape, but the words alone are not jogging his memory. He takes childish pleasure in saying the word ‘spool’.

The tape dates from the day he turned 39. His recorded voice says that he has just celebrated the occasion alone "at the wine house," jotting down notes in preparation for the later recording session. "The new light above my table is a great improvement," states the recorded Krapp, before describing how much he enjoys leaving it to wander off into the darkness so that he may return to the zone of light, identifying it with his essential self.

The voice reports that he has just reviewed an old tape from when he was in his late twenties. It amuses him to comment on his impressions of what he was like in his twenties, and the 69-year-old Krapp joins in the derisory laughter. The young man he was back then is described as idealistic and unrealistic in his expectations.

The voice reviews his last year, talking about sitting on a bench outside the nursing home and waiting for the news that his mother had died. Krapp in the current day is more interested in his younger self's use of the rather archaic word "viduity" (the state of being a widow) than the reaction of the voice on the tape to their mother's death. He stops listening to look up the word in a large dictionary. He returns to the tape; at the moment he learns of his mother's death, his younger self is in the process of throwing a rubber ball to a dog. He ends up simply leaving the ball with the dog.

The voice starts to describe the revelation he experienced at the end of a pier. Krapp grows impatient when his younger self starts enthusing about this. He fast-forwards to near the end of the tape to escape the onslaught of words, where suddenly the mood has changed and he finds himself in the middle of a description of a romantic liaison between himself and a woman in a punt. Krapp lets it play out and then rewinds the tape to hear the complete episode.

Afterwards, Krapp loads a fresh tape and begins to recount his year. He is scathing when it comes to his assessment of his thirty-nine-year-old self. He finds he has nothing he wants to record for posterity, save the fact he "revelled in the word spool." He mentions a trip to the park and attending Vespers, where he dozed off and fell off the pew. He also mentions his recent literary disappointments: "seventeen copies sold", presumably of his last book, eleven of which have gone not to interested readers but to foreign libraries. His sex life has been reduced to periodic visits by an old prostitute. Unlike his younger selves, Krapp has nothing good to say about the man he has become and even the idea of making a "last effort" when it comes to his writing upsets him.

He retreats into memories from his dim and distant past, gathering holly and walking the dog of a Sunday morning. He then remembers the girl on the punt and wrenches off the tape he has been recording, swapping back to the prior tape and replaying the entire section again. This time he allows the tape to play to the very end, with the thirty-nine-year-old Krapp determinedly not regretting the choices he has made, certain that what he would produce in the years to come would more than compensate him for any potential loss of happiness.

Krapp makes no response to this but allows the tape to play on, silent, until the final curtain.

== Structure ==
In Waiting for Godot, Beckett uses a circular, symmetrical structure as the template for his play, in Film the template is the writings of Bishop Berkeley, and in Krapp's Last Tape, according to Anthony Cronin, he uses Manichaeism as a structural device:

The dichotomy of light and dark ... is central to Manichaean doctrine ... Its adherents believed that the world was ruled by evil powers, against which the god of the whole of creation struggled as yet in vain ... Krapp is in violation of the three seals or prohibitions of Manichaeism for the elect: the seal of the hands, forbidding engagement in a profession, the seal of the breast against sexual desire, and the seal of the mouth, which forbids the drinking of wine ... Beckett [however] seems to have known no more about Manichaeism than is contained in the eleventh edition of the Encyclopædia Britannica, which he possessed.

== Analysis ==
"Krapp’s spool of life is almost wound, and the silent tape is both the time it has left to run and the silence into which he must pass." Whereas the younger Krapp talks about the "fire in me" the tired old man who sits listening is simply "burning to be gone." The title of the play seems obvious, that what we have witnessed is the recording of Krapp’s final tape, "yet there is an ambiguity: 'last' can mean 'most recent' as well as 'ultimate'. The speaker in Browning's My Last Duchess is already planning to marry his next duchess ... Still, one hopes for Krapp's sake that he will be gone before another year is over."

Black-and-white imagery features heavily throughout the play.

== Characters ==
Although there is only one person onstage, there are a number of 'characters' mentioned throughout. The play is considered to be Beckett at his most autobiographical, and it does draw heavily on biographical detail. He once told the scholar Lawrence Harvey, though, that his "work does not depend on experience – [it is] not a record of experience. Of course you use it." Beckett takes elements from his own life, his failed love life, his drinking, his – at the time – literary failures and looks where things might have gone. "When, in 1956, Vivian Mercier saw him in Paris, he told him that he felt 'all dried up, with nothing left but self-translation.'"

Krapp

Krapp was originally designated simply ‘A’ in the first draft. The first appearance of a title was "a manuscript edition to Typescript 2: Crapp’s Last Tape"; the more familiar Germanic spelling came later. The name Krapp with its excremental connotations had been used before by Beckett however. In his first play, Eleutheria (unstaged and unpublished during his life), dating back to 1947, the protagonist is Victor Krap, a young man who has decided to retreat from life and do nothing. He has been described as a world-weary anti-hero, a failed writer and seedy solipsist, a clear prototype for the later Krapp.

Krapp (as a boy)

When the thirty-nine-year-old Krapp is talking about his neighbour's ritual singing in the evening he tries to remember if he sang as a boy and is unable to do so. He does recall attending Vespers but it would be unusual for him to attend Evensong without participating in the singing of the hymn. The sixty-nine-year-old Krapp sings a few lines from the "Now the Day is Over" in early performances of the play but Beckett excised this as being "too clumsily explicit".

The 39-year-old Krapp looks back on the 20-odd-year-old Krapp with the same level of contempt as the 20-odd-year-old Krapp appears to have displayed for the young man he saw himself for in his late teens. Each can see clearly the fool he was but only time will reveal what kind of fool he has become.

Although no time frame is given, it is likely that sixty-nine-year-old Krapp's memories of being "again in the dingle at Christmas Eve, gathering holly ... [or] on Croghan on a Sunday morning, in the haze, with the bitch" alludes to Beckett's own childhood familial memories.

Krapp (in his twenties)

His birth-sign in early drafts is given as Aries, Beckett's own. All we learn about Krapp at this age comes from the tape. Like a lot of young men he is full of "aspirations" – his work is starting to take shape – and "resolutions" – he is already aware that his drinking needs to be curbed. He is becoming resigned to the fact that he might well have let true love – represented by the image of a "girl in a shabby green coat, on a railway-station platform" – get away from him. He has settled for an on/off relationship with a "Bianca" but even there his future plans do not feature her. We learn that his problem with constipation has been ongoing since at least this time. He disparages his youth and is glad it is over. The thirty-nine-year-old Krapp estimates that the tape he had been listening to was made some ten or twelve years earlier. If it was twelve then he would have been twenty-seven at the time it was recorded.

Bianca

"In the earlier drafts the woman with whom the young Krapp lived [later named "Bianca"] was first named 'Alba' (a character in Dream of Fair to Middling Women modelled on Ethna MacCarthy whom he had loved when he was a young man), then 'Celia' (the name of the green-eyed prostitute with whom Murphy cohabits in Murphy), then 'Furry' (nickname of Anne Rudmose-Brown, the wife of Beckett's French Professor at Trinity, who was himself satirised as 'the Polar Bear' in Dream of Fair to Middling Women).".

He settled on 'Bianca', who was most likely based on another lecturer, Bianca Esposito, who (along with Walter Starkie) taught him Italian and cultivated his lifelong passion for Dante. He took private lessons from Signorina Esposito as well. Those lessons at 21 Ely Place were then caricatured in the short story 'Dante and the Lobster'. Kedar Street is not a real location but an anagram of 'darke' or Hebrew for 'dark' (קודר). Keeping this in mind, the name may simply have been selected because "bianca" means "white woman" in Italian. Little is recorded about her other than "'a tribute to her eyes. Very warm.'" Vivian Mercier, who knew Beckett personally, writes: "Although I do not recall his ever using the phrase, Beckett unquestionably regards the eyes as the windows of the soul."

Krapp's father

Krapp’s father, the only other man mentioned in the play, is spoken of only very briefly. The expression "Last illness" suggests he has not been a well man for some time and dies while Krapp is in his twenties. His own father, William Beckett, died of a heart attack in June 1933, when Beckett was twenty-seven.

The girl in the green coat

Beckett's first love, his cousin, Peggy Sinclair, had "deep green eyes and [had a] passionate love of green clothing." An allusion to Peggy Sinclair also appears in Dream of Fair to Middling Women in Smeraldina, the "little emerald". Although the relationship is often cited as being a little one-sided, Beckett does recall: "Oh, Peggy didn’t need any chasing."

Krapp (aged 39)

This character does the majority of the talking throughout the play. His voice is contained on Tape 5 from Box 3. His voice is strong and rather pompous. He has celebrated his birthday alone in an empty wine house before returning home to consume three bananas. As has become his practice on his birthday he makes a tape looking back at who he was, assessing who he is and anticipating what might be to come. His is as disparaging of the young man he was in his twenties as he was then of the youth he had been thinking about when he made that earlier tape. He records the death of his mother, an epiphany at the end of a pier and an idyllic moment in a punt.

Old Mrs McGlome

This character is based on Miss Beamish, an eccentric novelist from Connacht whom Beckett had met in Roussillon, while hiding during World War II. "Whether the real Miss Beamish did actually sing regularly every evening is ... debatable. Beckett did not remember this."

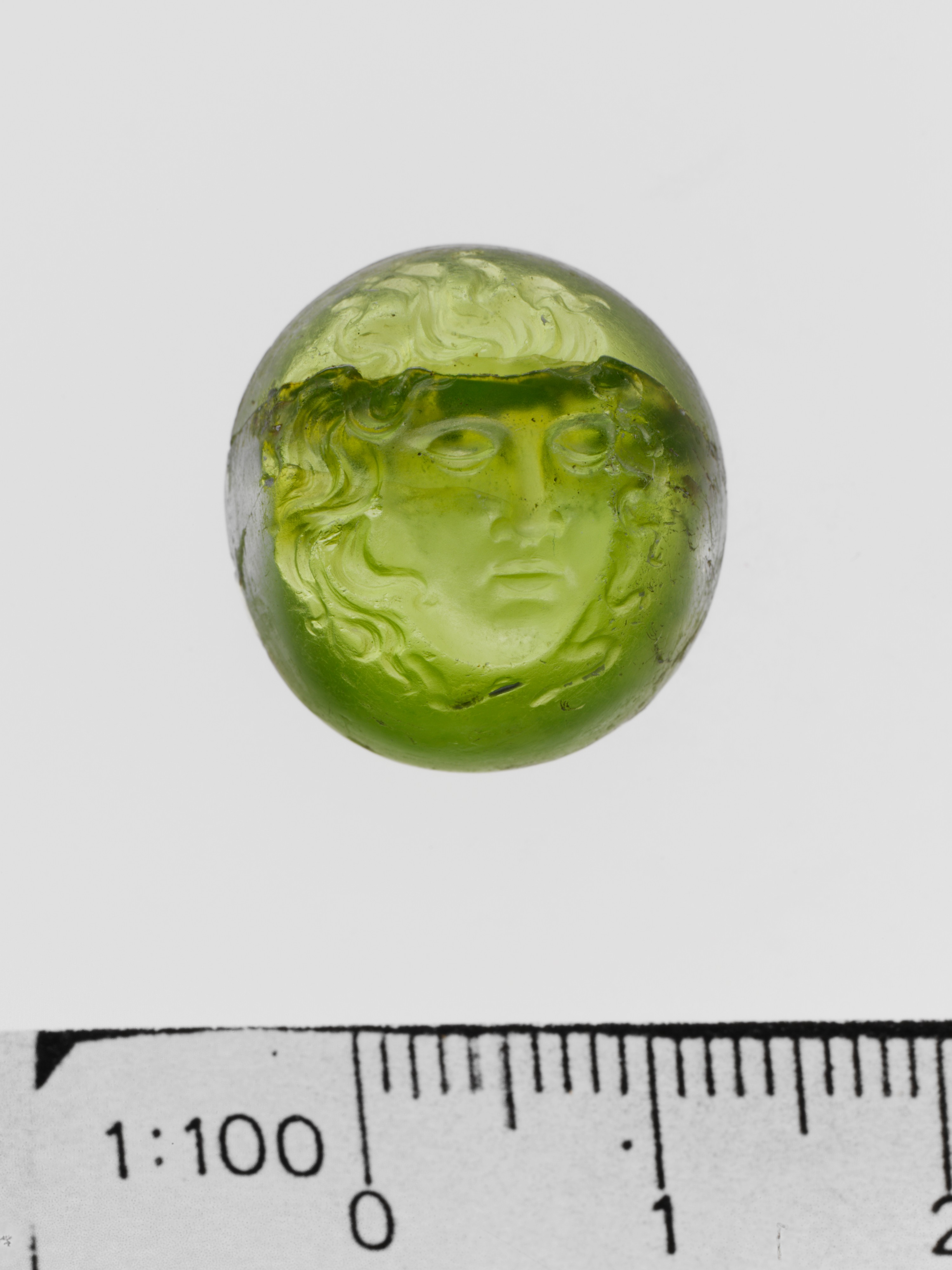
Chrysolite stone with intaglio carving; the "dark young beauty" has eyes of this colour

The dark young beauty

There appears to be no direct correlation between this character and anyone living. The black-and-white imagery is strong here: her white uniform and the "big black hooded perambulator." Krapp also remembers this woman’s eyes as being "[l]ike ... chrysolite!"

Rosemary Pountney observes Beckett changed "moonstone" to chrysolite, an olive-green coloured mineral, in Typescript 4.

She observes also that Beckett made "a direct connection ... with Othello, a play in which dark and light imagery is central," as "in the margin of the text that he used for the 1973 London production," on page 15 where the word 'chrysolite' occurs ... he writes:

If heaven would make me such another world

Of one entire and perfect chrysolite
I’d not have sold her for it

Othello V2.

"Like Othello, too," Pountney continues, "Krapp has lost his love through his own folly."

Krapp's mother

Beckett’s mother, May, died on 25 August 1950 in the Merrion Nursing Home which overlooked Dublin’s Grand Canal. Beckett had made the trip over in the early summer to be with her. By 24 July medical opinion confirmed that she was dying. During that last long month he used "to walk disconsolately alone along the towpath of the Grand Canal."

Towards the end she was oblivious to his presence. Her death took place while he was sitting on a bench by the canal. "At a certain point he happened to look up. The blinds of his mother’s window, a dirty red-brown affair, was down. She was dead." A drawn blind, an old custom signifying death, also makes an appearance in Rockaby: "let down the blind and down".

The little white dog

When Krapp’s mother died, he was throwing a ball for a little white dog. He says he will keep it forever: "But I gave it away to the dog." Significantly the ball is black to contrast with the white of the dog. In All Strange Away a "small grey punctured rubber ball" is the last object contemplated before Fancy dies. The ball had already appeared in All That Fall: Jerry returns "a kind of ball" to Mr. Rooney. Although not an obvious symbol of death, this ball is a significant motif of childhood grief for Beckett though none of his biographers propose that the presence of the dog is anything more than artistic license.

The girl in the punt

Beckett makes the relationship of this woman to Krapp clear when "[i]n 1975, directing Pierre Chabert in Paris, Beckett said: 'I thought of writing a play on the opposite situation, with Mrs Krapp, the girl in the punt, nagging away behind him, in which case his failure and his solitude would be exactly the same.'" In her biography of Beckett, Deirdre Bair deduces that "the girl in the punt" may be Peggy Sinclair because of the references to "Effi" and to "the Baltic": in July 1929 Beckett vacationed with the Sinclairs "in one of the smaller resort towns along the Baltic Sea. Summer, traditionally the time for light reading, found Peggy tearfully engrossed in Theodor Fontane's novel, Effi Briest. Beckett read it too, but with more detachment than Peggy, who wept and suffered as Effi's infidelity ended her marriage." Talking to James Knowlson, a few days before his death, Beckett said that he "did not remember the scene this way, however, denying that girl in the boat ... had anything at all to do with his cousin, Peggy." Knowlson feels "that there is little doubt the source for the girl with the haunting eyes is Ethna MacCarthy. For, as Dream of Fair to Middling Women had made clear ... the 'Alba', who, on Beckett’s own admission, was closely modelled on Ethna, had eyes like dark, deep pools." Beckett left no doubt however when he told Jean Martin, whilst rehearsing the play in 1970, that the girl was modelled on Ethna. On 11 December 1957 Beckett learned that Ethna was terminally ill and regularly wrote uncharacteristically long letters until her death. When he completed the play he wrote her: "I’ve written in English a stage monologue for Pat Magee which I think you will like if no one else."

At one point in the recollection, the young Krapp leans over the young woman to shade her from the sun. "Let me in," he says. This caused the Lord Chamberlain some concerns when the play was first presented before him to grant a license. He believed that what was being suggested was a desire for sexual penetration and was not convinced that Beckett was simply alluding to her eyes. It was not until a mere three weeks before the play's opening that the objection was dropped. In 1982 Beckett, in response to a similar suggestion from one of James Knowlson's postgraduate students, "said with a chuckle, 'Tell her to read her texts more carefully. She'll see that Krapp would need to have a penis at an angle of a hundred and eighty degrees to make coitus possible in the position he is in!'"––a position that Rosette C. Lamont proposes also "suggests that of a suckling babe."

Krapp (aged 69)

Beckett would not be 69 until 1975 so, from his perspective, with Krapp a proxy for him, the action is set in the future. The first line of the play explicitly sets it 'in the future', although nothing onstage reveals this. Beckett wrote this play shortly before he turned 52 years old. As it happens, with Waiting for Godot, success had found him but, at 39, the future must have seemed a lot bleaker for the writer, the Second World War was ending and all Beckett had had published were a few poems, a collection of short stories and the novel, Murphy. Beckett had this to say about the drained old man we see onstage: "Krapp sees very clearly that he’s through with his work, with love and religion." He told Rick Cluchey, whom he directed in 1977, that Krapp was "in no way senile [but has] something frozen about him [and is] filled up to his teeth with bitterness." "Habit, the great deadener" has proven more tenacious than inspiration. His "present concerns revolve around the gratification of those very bodily appetites that, earlier, he had resolved should be out of his life. Eating bananas and drinking have become a [daily routine]. Of the physical activities that he once considered excesses only sex has come to play a reduced part in his lonely existence" in the form of periodic visits from an old prostitute.

Although this is a play about memory, the sixty-nine-year-old Krapp himself remembers very little. Virtually all the recollections come from the tape. As evidenced most clearly in the novel Murphy, Beckett had a decent understanding of a variety of mental illnesses including Korsakoff's Alcoholic Syndrome––"A hypomaniac teaching slosh to a Korsakow's syndrome."––which is characterised by powerful amnesic symptoms accompanied by intestinal obstruction.

In his focus on chronic alcohol consumption, Narinder Kapur explains in Memory Disorders in Clinical Practice that it can lead to marked memory loss and generalised cognitive defects, as well as "disorientation for time and also place". More recent memories are likely to be forgotten than remote memories, for "memory loss shows a temporal gradient with greater sparing of items from earlier years." Krapp's gathering of red-berried holly in the dingle could be an example of the "relatively intact remote memory" that preceded Krapp's apparent addiction to alcohol.

Krapp is not a textbook case. He is an individual with his own individual symptomology but he is more than a list of symptoms. Bananas contain pectin, a soluble fibre that can help normalise movement through the digestive tract and ease constipation. Bananas can also aggravate constipation especially in young children. It depends what the root cause of the problem is. They are also high in Vitamins A and C as well as niacin, riboflavin and thiamine and one of the root causes of Korsakoff's Syndrome is thiamine deficiency; eating bananas would be good for him. It is easy to get caught up in this kind of over-analysis to the detriment of the play as a whole. "[A]ttempts to demonstrate that Beckett's characters conform to specific psychological syndromes so often turn into will-o-the-wisp pursuits. Certainly, Beckett would not deny that psychologists have offered very useful descriptions of mental activity. But their theories are typically no more than initial steps in an understanding of mental processes, fragmented bits of knowledge which should not be taken for universal principles." It is important to remember that Krapp has not simply forgotten his past but he has consciously and systematically rejected it as one way of reassuring himself that he has made the right decisions in "his yearly word letting."

Effi Briest

In the past year Krapp has been re-reading Fontane's Effi Briest, "a page a day, with tears again," he says, "Could have been happy with her, up there on the Baltic...." Existing only on the printed page this fantasy woman is perhaps the most black-and-white of all Krapp’s women. Like the girl in the punt and the nursemaid mentioned earlier, perhaps to contrast with his inner fire, "Once again Beckett situates Krapp's memory on some side near the water."

Fanny

Just as Krapp’s name is a vulgar pun, so is the name Beckett gave to the woman who visits him from time to time, whom he describes as a "bony old ghost of a whore." As Fanny is an "old ghost," all Krapp's women are figuratively "ghosts, really, dependent for their existence on Krapp's bitter-sweet recording of them," according to Katherine Worth.

"Fanny" is a slang British expression for the vulva – woman reduced to a function. "Fanny" is also a commonly used diminutive of Frances, and Beckett occasionally referred to his aunt, Frances "Cissie" Sinclair, as "Fanny."

Krapp refers to her visits as "better than a kick in the crutch." In the 1985 television version, Beckett changed this phrase to "better than the finger and the thumb," an unambiguous reference to masturbation that would never have escaped the British Lord Chamberlain in the 1950s.

Krapp's "vision at last", on the pier at Dún Laoghaire

In an earlier draft of the play Beckett "uses 'beacon' and 'anemometer' rather than 'lighthouse' and 'wind-gauge'. The anemometer on the East Pier of Dún Laoghaire was one of the world's first. [It is] widely regarded as a mirror reflection of Beckett's own revelation. Yet it is different both in circumstance and kind."

"Beckett wrote to Richard Ellmann: 'All the jetty and howling wind are imaginary. It happened to me, summer 1945, in my mother's little house, named New Place, across the road from Cooldrinagh.'"

He summarised what this experience signified for him:

I realised that Joyce had gone as far as one could in the direction of knowing more, [being] in control of one's material. He was always adding to it; you only have to look at his proofs to see that. I realised that my own way was in impoverishment, in lack of knowledge and in taking away, in subtracting rather than in adding.

The tape recorder

Beckett has applied character to non-human elements in his plays before, e.g. the light in Play, the music in Words and Music. "Beckett instructed the actor Pierre Chabert in his 1975 Paris production of the play 'to become as much as possible one body with the machine ... The spool is his whole life.'" Krapp no longer owns the memories on the tapes. His mind is no longer capable of holding onto them. The recorder also serves as proxy. When John Hurt, as Krapp, is transfixed by the retelling of the events in the punt he literally cradles the machine as if it were the woman, recalling Magee’s original performance; Beckett took pains to point this out to Alan Schneider, who was at the time preparing his own version of the play, in a letter dated 21 November 1958, and incorporated the gesture in future productions in which he was involved.

Later, on 4 January 1960, Beckett wrote a more detailed letter describing another unexpected revelation of that earlier performance, "the beautiful and quite accidental effect in London of the luminous eye burning up as the machine runs on in silence and the light goes down."

== Notable performances of Krapp ==
Extended content

=== Cyril Cusack ===
Cyril Cusack played Krapp in a June 1960 production at the Abbey Theatre in Dublin, later at the Empire Theatre in Belfast, Northern Ireland, and in a television production directed by Prudence Fitzgerald and broadcast on 13 November 1963 on the British television program Festival.

=== David Kelly ===
In 1996, the Gate Theatre visited Lincoln Center in New York where David Kelly performed ‘Krapp,’ receiving standing ovations at every performance. Kelly had first performed the play in Dublin in 1959 and the original recordings of his ‘young self’ were discovered. These were painstakingly remastered by Noel Storey at Beacon Studios in Dublin to be used on stage. It is believed to be the only time that real 30 year old recordings have been used. The New York Times broke their own rules by saying in their review that "Kelly’s performance is the best that will ever be".

=== Patrick Magee ===
The play was first performed as a curtain raiser to Endgame (from 28 October to 29 November 1958) at the Royal Court Theatre, London, directed by Donald McWhinnie and starring Patrick Magee. It ran for 38 performances. This production was recreated for television in 1972, again directed by McWhinnie and starring Magee.

Beckett told Magee, the original Krapp, that his "voice was the one which he heard inside his mind. Thus it seems likely that the return to English was a matter of expediency because of the English-speaking actor."

Magee had a harsh, gravely voice which had little superficial charm but had a hypnotic effect on the listener ... He was grey-haired but ageless and could combine debility with menace, as Beckett characters with their suppressed violence often do ... [H]e had developed a rather strange accent with only faint Irish overtones and prolonged vowel sounds, The general effect was strangely déclassé but still indubitably Irish and thus ideally fitted for the performance of Beckett ... As an actor, he had the good sense to see that one played Beckett for the weight and mood of the words and the situation without bothering about the ultimate philosophical import.

=== Donald Davis ===
The Canadian actor Donald Davis played Krapp in the North American premiere production of Krapp's Last Tape at the Provincetown Playhouse, with Davis winning an Obie Award in 1960 for his performance in the play "as the lonely, solitary Krapp, playing the tapes of his life and re-experiencing decades of regret." Later, Krapp's Last Tape, directed by Alan Schneider, was a long-running performance at the Provincetown Playhouse, for which a 33 RPM recording was issued (see article and liner notes). He later re-created the role in October 1968 at the Billy Rose Theatre in New York City again directed by Alan Schneider.

=== Jack MacGowran ===
In 1971, Alan Schneider directed Jack MacGowran in a videotaped production that was meant to be broadcast on WNET, but for some reason was rejected and never shown and "languished in a closet" until found in 1988 and painstakingly restored.

=== Hume Cronyn ===
Hume Cronyn played the role of Krapp November 22 - December 17, 1972 at the Mitzi E. Newhouse Theater in New York City as part of the Samuel Beckett Festival in a program directed by Alan Schneider which also included the World Premiere of Not I (starring Jessica Tandy), Happy Days (with both Tandy and Cronyn) and Act Without Words I (performed by Cronyn).

=== Rick Cluchey ===
Co-Founder of the San Quentin Drama Workshop, was directed by Beckett in 1977 in Berlin and later videotaped in 1988 as part of the Beckett Directs Beckett collection (again directed by Beckett with Walter Asmus). He played the role again, directed by Beckett, off-Broadway at the Samuel Beckett Theatre August 27 - November 30, 1986.

=== Max Wall ===
Max Wall performed Krapp on a number of occasions, including London's Greenwich Theatre (1975 – directed by Patrick Magee) and Riverside Studios (1986).

=== John Hurt ===
John Hurt performed the role of Krapp for the version directed by Atom Egoyan for the Beckett on Film project, which was broadcast on television in 2001 and available on DVD in the box set or individually. Before that there was a production at the Ambassadors Theatre, London from 25 January to 11 March 2000. In November 2011, directed by Michael Colgan, he reprised the role pre-Broadway at the Shakespeare Theatre Company in Washington DC followed by a limited Broadway run. He used the tape recordings from the 2001 production in the performance. In December 2011, again directed by Colgan, he reprised the role at the Brooklyn Academy of Music in New York City as part of the BAM 2011 Next Wave Festival. He once again took up the role in Dublin's Gate Theatre for 10 performances in March 2013. Charles McNulty lauded it as a "magnificent rendition".

=== Harold Pinter ===
Krapp, as portrayed by Harold Pinter at the Royal Court Theatre in October 2006

As part of the 50th anniversary season of the Royal Court Theatre, in October 2006, directed by Ian Rickson, English playwright Harold Pinter performed the role of Krapp in a sold-out limited run of nine performances to great critical acclaim; a performance of this production was broadcast on BBC Four. In this production, Krapp is confined to a motorized wheelchair and the banana business at the beginning is cut; Krapp also uses two tape machines, one to listen to his past recording and the other to record his new tape.

=== Corin Redgrave ===
Corin Redgrave performed the role of Krapp for BBC Radio 3 in 2006 a few months after he had suffered a major heart attack. The production was rebroadcast on BBC Radio 3 on 16 May 2010 as part of a double bill with a 2006 production of Embers.

=== Brian Dennehy ===
Brian Dennehy performed the role of Krapp during the 2008 Stratford Shakespeare Festival, in 2010 at the Goodman Theatre of Chicago from 16 January through 28 February and in 2011 at the Long Wharf Theatre of New Haven, all three times directed by Jennifer Tarver. The Beckett one-act was paired in Stratford and Chicago with Eugene O'Neill's Hughie (directed by Robert Falls), also a one-act, and also performed by Dennehy, in the lead role of "Erie Smith". A Broadway run was also planned, but not realized. Dennehy's double bill of Hughie/Krapp's Last Tape was performed at the Geffen Playhouse in Los Angeles, this time directed by Steven Robman, from 5 November – 16 December 2018.

=== Michael Gambon ===
In April 2010 Irish actor Michael Gambon continued his relationship with both Beckett and the Gate Theatre when he returned to the Dublin stage as Krapp for a limited run which was followed by a transfer to London's West End.

=== Richard Bremmer ===
Richard Bremmer took on the eponymous role of Krapp at the Bristol Old Vic between April and May 2012, receiving critical acclaim across the board. This was in a double bill with A Kind of Alaska by Harold Pinter in which Bremmer also appeared. They were both directed by Simon Godwin.

=== Gerard Murphy ===
In 2012, at Glasgow's Citizens Theatre, Gerard Murphy performed the role, even though he was suffering spinal cord compression due to prostate cancer.

=== Robert Wilson ===
Robert Wilson performed Krapp at the Barbican, London, in June 2015. He also performed "Krapp" at the Ardhowen Theatre in Enniskillen, Northern Ireland in August 2012 (directing himself), at the Alexander Kasser Theater on the campus of Montclair State University in March 2016 and at the Akademie der Künste in Berlin in 2019 (which he also directed). In January 2018, he performed Krapp in the Santiago a Mil International Festival in Santiago de Chile, which he also directed (co-director Charles Chemin).

=== James Hayes ===
James Hayes played Krapp in a 2020 production directed by Trevor Nunn at the Jermyn Street Theatre in a double bill with The Old Tune (adapted by Beckett from a radio play by Robert Pinget).

=== Stephen Rea ===
Stephen Rea played Krapp in a production directed by Vicky Featherstone for Landmark Productions at Dublin's Project Arts Centre in January 2024. The production then moved to Dublin's Gaiety Theatre in October 2024. In February – March 2025, the production plays at the Dunstan Playhouse at the Adelaide Festival Centre in Adelaide, South Australia, then at the Barbican Theatre in London in April – May 2025. The production returned to Dublin in July 2025, where it played at the Pavilion Theatre (Dún Laoghaire).

=== F. Murray Abraham ===
F. Murray Abraham plays Krapp in a new production at New York City's Irish Repertory Theatre 15 January - 9 March 2025. The play is part of Beckett Briefs: From the Cradle Through the Grave, a collection of three Beckett one-act plays.

=== Gary Oldman ===
Gary Oldman played Krapp in a production at York Theatre Royal (the theatre in which Oldman made his professional acting debut in 1979) in 2025. The play ran from 14 April to 17 May 2025 to critical acclaim. Oldman reprised his performance in May 2026 at London's Royal Court Theatre as part of its 70th anniversary season.

== Reception ==
Krapp’s Last Tape is one of Beckett’s most frequently performed dramas and has been referred to as "one of his most personal works". Daniel Sack considers the part of Krapp to be "one of the greatest in the English language."

== Media recordings ==
Beckett opposed vehemently the transfer of some of his works from one medium to another, but he did not oppose such recordings of Krapp's Last Tape as much as he did others. For example, "A gramophone recording (New York: Spoken Arts #788, 1960), based on the original American production, was distributed by Argo (RG 220), and by HEAR, Home Educational Records, London (1964),"(this recording starred Donald Davis) and "It was often adapted for television with his encouragement." The first BBC version was produced by Peter Luke, featuring Cyril Cusack (13 November 1963). Approached by Westdeutscher Rundfunk, Cologne, to permit a television version of his 1969 Schiller-Theatre Das letzte Band [the German title of the play], Beckett wrote a set of "Suggestions for TV Krapp", which "was broadcast [on] 28th October 1969."

The play has subsequently been broadcast on radio, turned into an opera (see below) and filmed as part of the Beckett on Film project and for the DVD of Pinter's Royal Court performance, both of which have been shown on television.

== Musical adaptations ==
There have been several musical adaptations of Krapp's Last Tape, most notably the opera Krapp, ou, La dernière bande by composer Marcel Mihalovici. American composer Earl Kim alludes to the work within his Gooseberries, she said (1967), part of the four-part cycle Exercises en Route. The Hungarian composer Gyula Csapó has created the work Krapp's Last Tape –- after Samuel Beckett (1975) loosely inspired by Beckett's play. This theatrical work is for a "violinist-actor," a tape recorder, four spotlights and a sine wave generator. In 1999, the English experimental composer, Michael Parsons, adapted Krapp's Last Tape for piano, two pre-recorded pianos, and voice on tape. The piece, specifically written for John Tilbury, was called Krapp Music.
