= Belacqua =

Minor character in Dante's Purgatorio discussed extensively by Samuel Beckett

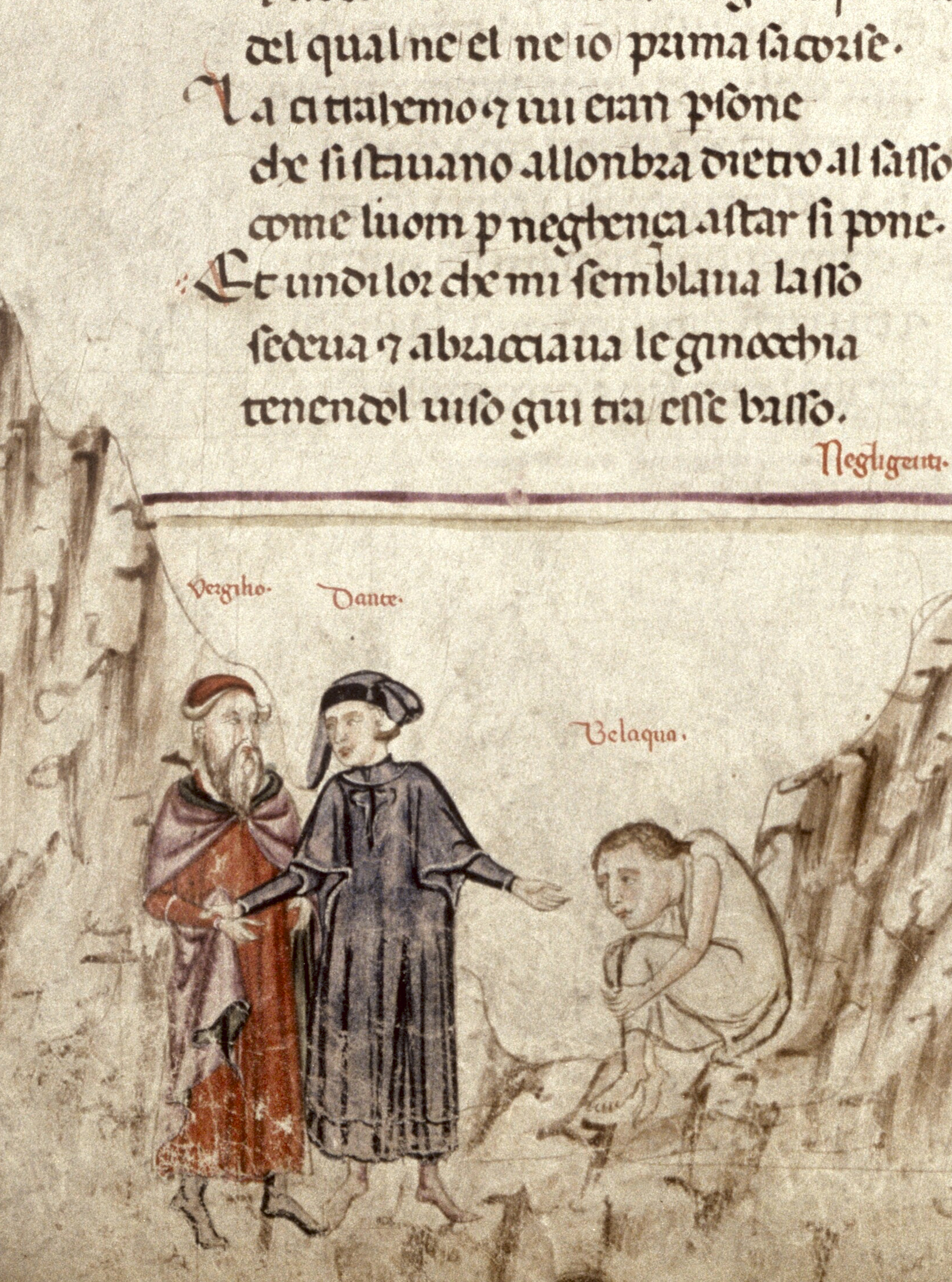
Virgil and Dante meet Belacqua, Holkham manuscript at the Bodleian

Belacqua is a minor character in Dante Alighieri's Purgatorio, Canto IV. He is considered the epitome of indolence and laziness, but he is nonetheless saved from the punishment of Hell in Inferno and often viewed as a comic element in the poem for his wit. The relevance of Belacqua is also driven by Samuel Beckett's strong interest in this character.

== Belacqua in the Divine Comedy ==
Belacqua is found by Dante and Virgil in Ante-Purgatory as he sits in a fetal position under a large rock with other souls. They are condemned to wait in Ante-Purgatory as long as they waited in life to repent and turn to God. Dante recognizes Belacqua, his friend, by "his lazy movements and curt speech," which causes Dante to smile, offering a comedic moment during Dante's arduous climb up the mountain of Purgatory. The two then proceed to have a witty exchange.

Belacqua's introduction eases the friction between Virgil and Dante, the former of whom just before firmly dismisses Dante's desire for rest. The encounter with Belacqua also slows down the action in the canto, as Dante pauses his ascent to move horizontally towards his friend.

In life, Belacqua suffered from the vice of sloth, yet Dante shows notable compassion for him in this poem of morality. Furthermore, Belacqua's late "sighs of penance" demonstrate his sloth even in his path towards salvation. However, it is argued that Belacqua surrenders to God's will in his refusal to ascend the mountain since he will not be accepted until he completes his time in Ante-Purgatory. In this respect, he does not indulge in sloth but undergoes a contrapasso for his inattention to God for the majority of his life. Virgil, however, seems unamused by Belacqua and urges Dante to move on, perhaps implying his disapproval of Belacqua's salvation, particularly since Virgil himself is damned.

The interpretation of Belacqua's representation in the Divine Comedy has evolved over the years, as earlier commentators interpreted his salvation as a sign of God's generosity, while modern readers more often appreciate his wit and the irony of his presence.

The name "Belacqua" was identified by early commentators as the nickname of Duccio di Bonavia, a Florentine musician, a maker of musical instruments, and a friend of Dante who had a reputation for extreme laziness. Records state that he was alive in 1299 and dead in 1302. Since Dante's visit to Purgatory is set in 1300, it is assumed that Duccio must have died by that date.

== Beckett's Belacqua ==
Samuel Beckett, whose favorite reading was Dante, closely identified with Belacqua and his indolence.

Beckett introduced ‘Belacqua Shuah’ as the main character in his first novel Dream of Fair to Middling Women. Unpublishable at the time, Beckett tried again with More Pricks Than Kicks, a collection of ten interrelated short stories on the life and death of Belacqua, and this was published, although a very poor seller. Beckett makes the Dante connection explicit in the first story, ‘Dante and the Lobster’: Belacqua is studying Dante. An eleventh story, ‘Echo's Bones’ was unpublishable at the time. It tells of the indolent afterlife of Belacqua, trying to sit in a fetal position as much as possible and being interrupted by visitors.

In later fiction, Beckett would sometimes refer to Dante's Belacqua. The title character of Murphy has a Belacqua fantasy. The narrator of How It Is describes one of his sleeping postures in terms of Belacqua. Company's narrator refers to the ‘old lutist cause of Dante's first quarter-smile’ and wonders if the old lutist has made it to Paradise by now. At the beginning of Molloy, the narrator, who is doing nothing but watching passers, likens himself to Belacqua or Sordello as he crouches to avoid being detected.

== General references ==
=== Dante-related ===
- George D. Economon (2011). "Belacqua". In Richard Lansing (ed.). The Dante Encyclopedia. Routledge. p. 96. ISBN 9781136849725.
- Ralph Hayward Keniston (1912). "The Dante Tradition in the Fourteenth and Fifteenth Centuries". Annual Reports of the Dante Society (31): 45. JSTOR 40178473.
- Fernando Salsano (1970). "Belacqua". In Bosco, Umberto; Petrocchi, Giorgio (eds.). Enciclopedia Dantesca (in Italian). Istituto dell'Enciclopedia Italiana.
- Charles S. Singleton (1973). The Divine Comedy of Dante Alighieri. Vol. II part 2. Princeton University Press. pp. 88–91. ISBN 9780691019109.
- Paget Toynbee (1898). "Belacqua". A Dictionary of Proper Names and Notable Matters in the Works of Dante. Oxford at the Clarendon Press. p. 74.

=== Beckett-related ===
- Julie Campbell (2001). ""Echo's Bones" and Beckett's Disembodied Voices". Samuel Beckett Today/Aujourd'hui. 11: 454–60. JSTOR 25781397.
- Daniela Caselli (2000). ""The Florentia Edition in the Ignoble Salani Collection": A Textual Comparison". Journal of Beckett Studies. New Series. 9 (2): 1–20. doi:10.3366/jobs.2000.9.2.2.
- Daniela Caselli (2006). Beckett's Dantes: Intertextuality in the fiction and criticism. Manchester University Press.
- Daniela Caselli (2013). "Italian Literature". In Anthony Uhlmann (ed.). Samuel Beckett in Context. Cambridge University Press. pp. 241–252. ISBN 9781107017030.
- Caroline Mannweiler (2010). "Becketts Belacqua: Lob und Tadel einer Anti-Haltung". In Klaus Ley (ed.). Dante Alighieri und sein Werk in Literatur, Musik und Kunst bis zur Postmoderne. Tübingen: Francke. pp. 151–68.
- Walter A. Strauss (Summer 1959). "Dante's Belacqua and Beckett's Tramps". Comparative Literature. 11 (3): 250–261. doi:10.2307/1768359. JSTOR 1768359.
