= Benoit Dupuis =

French photographer

- Born: January 13, 1956 (age 70)
- Education: National School of Fine Arts in Bourges
- Occupations: Photographer, designer, publisher
- Website: https://eden-olympia.net

Benoit Dupuis (born January 13, 1956) is a French photographer, designer and publisher currently based in Tokyo, Japan. He is known for his photography work, documenting the human experience and cultural diversity across decades and continents.

He is also the co-founder of Tofu Magazine, which he curated during his time in Hong Kong.

== Life and education ==
Benoit Dupuis was born in Auxerre, France. He studied photography at the National School of Fine Arts in Bourges in 1976. During his time in school he formed a friendship with fellow artist Philippe Batrosse, sharing a mutual interest in art and rebellion against traditional education. Feeling constrained by the academic environment, Dupuis and Batrosse relocated to Paris in 1977, immersing themselves in the emerging punk scene.

== Career ==
Dupuis's early years in Paris were characterized by his involvement in the punk community, during which he documented the energy and creativity of the era. In 1979, he relocated to San Francisco, encountering a new wave of artistic expression which fueled a passion for exploration and prompted extensive travels throughout Mexico and the United States.

In 1984, Dupuis's trajectory shifted when he met Rudi Stern, owner of the Let There Be Neon gallery in New York City. Becoming the designer for the gallery's Paris branch, Dupuis temporarily diverted from photography to focus on visual arts and design.

Following studies in painting in Brussels and Venice, Dupuis pursued a career as a freelance artist, specializing in large-scale murals and architectural trompe-l'oeil.

=== Tofu Magazine ===
In 1996, he moved to Hong Kong and in 1999 he co-founded the cross-cultural magazine Tofu Magazine with graphic designer Daniel Gé. This venture marked the onset of Dupuis's deeper engagement with Asia and its diverse cultural milieu.

=== Later work ===
In 2008, Dupuis moved to Japan and returned to photography. Since then, he has worked on several photographic projects focusing on Asia's landscapes, people, and cultures. His portfolio covers various subjects, including Tokyo's urban environment and Cambodia's natural environment. He has also created a series of photographs of the so-called "homeless" who call the broad banks of the Arakawa River, in Tokyo's east, their home. In 2020 he documented the demonstrations taking place in Hong Kong with his "Action Painting" series.

== Exhibitions ==
- 2008 – Bophana Audiovisual Resource Center in Phnom Penh, Cambodia
- 2010 – Des Photographes, des Japons exhibition at the Institut Franco Japonais in Tokyo, Japan
- 2016 – Yakushima Photography Festival in Yakushima, Japan.
- 2023 – Fotozofio slideshow exhibition in Kyoto, Japan

=== External links ===
- Official website
- Tofu Magazine
