= Echo's Bones =

1933 short story by Samuel Beckett

First edition (1935)

‘Echo's Bones’ is a short story by Samuel Beckett that was originally written in 1933. The Europa Press published a stand alone version of the story in 1935. This edition included 25 copies signed by Becket.

The title is an allusion to the myth of Echo and Narcissus, in the version told in Ovid, Metamorphoses, Book III. In particular, the line "Echo's bones were turned to stone" is in Beckett's Dream of Fair to Middling Women notebook.

== Background ==
Beckett's collection More Pricks Than Kicks, ten stories in the life and death of one Belacqua Shuah, was accepted for publication by Chatto & Windus in 1933. The editor asked Beckett for an additional story to help bulk up the physical book. Beckett agreed, and chose to place the new story after the existing ten, and did so by giving an afterlife to Belacqua.

His editor, Charles Prentice, quickly rejected the story as too strange:

It is a nightmare. Just too terribly persuasive. It gives me the jim-jams.

Beckett later (1962) gave the typescript to Lawrence Harvey. The typescript and a carbon copy ended up in Beckett archives, and has been available for study by scholars.

Beckett rewrote the ending of "Draff", the last story in More Pricks Than Kicks, taking text from "Echo's Bones". The opening paragraph was published in Chris Ackerley's Demented Particulars: The Annotated Murphy (Journal of Beckett Studies, 1998). The title itself was used as the title of a poem, and then for his poetry anthology Echo's Bones and Other Precipitates.

The story was finally published in 2014, by Faber and Faber in the U.K. and Grove Press in the U.S., edited by Mark Nixon, the director of the Beckett International Foundation at the University of Reading. In addition to the story, Echo's Bones contains an introduction, extensive annotations (longer than the text), and the 1933 letters from Prentice to Beckett.

== Summary ==
Belacqua finds himself alive again, and spends his time sitting on a fence, smoking cigars.

After what seems like forty days, Belacqua is approached and ravaged by Zaborovna Privet, and ends up sitting on a fence again.

He is then struck by a stray golf ball, hit by Lord Haemo Gall of Wormwood, an impotent giant, whose main concern is producing a male heir. Belacqua is kidnapped for this purpose, but the child turns out to be a girl.

Belacqua ends up sitting on his own tombstone. The unnamed groundsman in "Draff" who tended to Belacqua's grave is back, now named Mick Doyle and intending to rob the grave. Belacqua bets Doyle he'll find nothing there. Only stones are found.
