= Radunsky =

Radunsky (feminine: Radunskaya) is a surname.

- Aleksand Radunsky (1912–1982), Russia ballet dancer, choreographer, and teacher
- Ivan Radunsky, played the part of Bim in the clown duo of Bim Bom
- Vladimir Radunsky, Russian-born American artist, designer, author and illustrator

== See also ==
- Peter Radunski (1939–2026), German politician
