= Ivan Radunsky =

Polish clown

- Born: 1872
- Died: 1955 (aged 82–83)
- Occupations: Clown, actor

Ivan Radunsky (1872 – 1955) played the part of Bim in the clown duo of Bim Bom. He was the founder of that duo.

He was a Pole by birth.

His group may have influenced the characters "Bim" and "Bom" in Samuel Beckett's More Pricks than Kicks and What Where.
