= Vitaly Lazarenko =

Russian/Soviet acrobat (1890–1939)

- Born: Vitaly Yefimovich Lazarenko; May 9, 1890; Aleksandrovsk-Grushevsky, Don Host Oblast, Russian Empire
- Died: May 18, 1939 (aged 49); Moscow, Soviet Union
- Occupations: Acrobat, clown

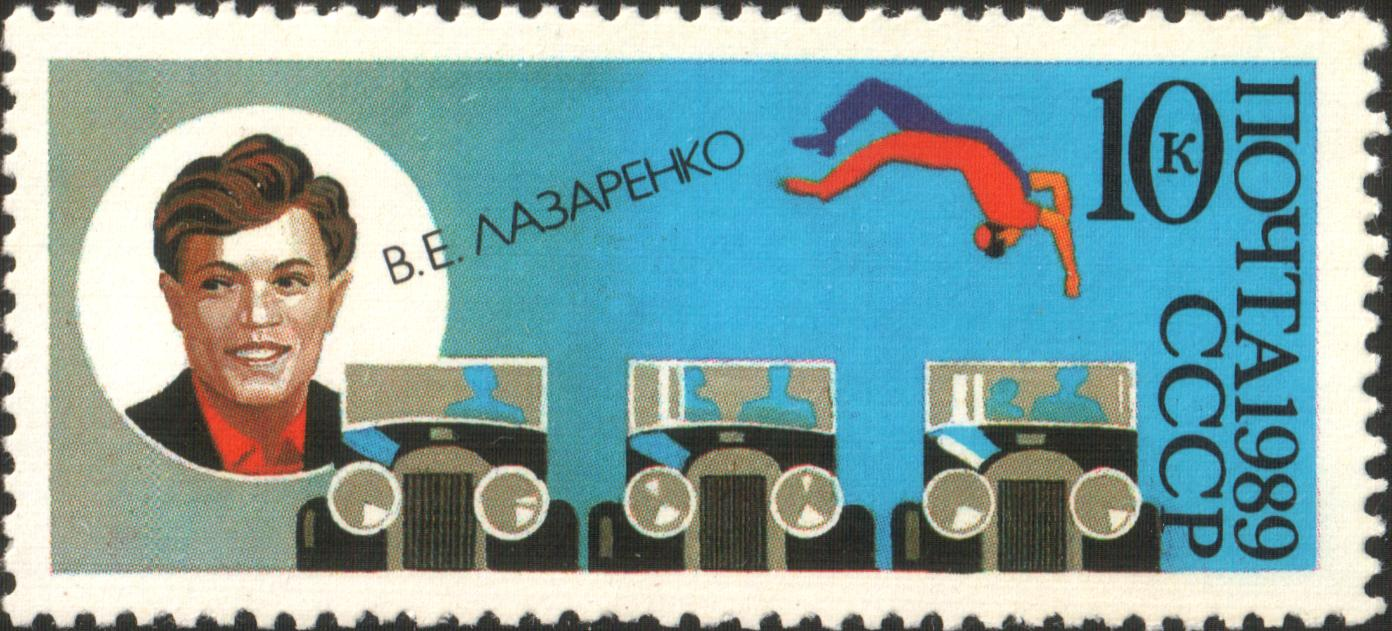

Vitaly Yefimovich Lazarenko (Russian: Виталий Ефимович Лазаренко; 9 May, 1890 – 18 May, 1939) was a Russian and Soviet acrobat and clown, known for his acrobatic skills and use of political satire during events.

He performed in the clown duo Bim Bom.
