= Krapp, ou, La dernière bande =

Krapp, ou, La dernière bande The Last Tape Krapp, oder Das letzte Band
- Chamber opera by Marcel Mihalovici
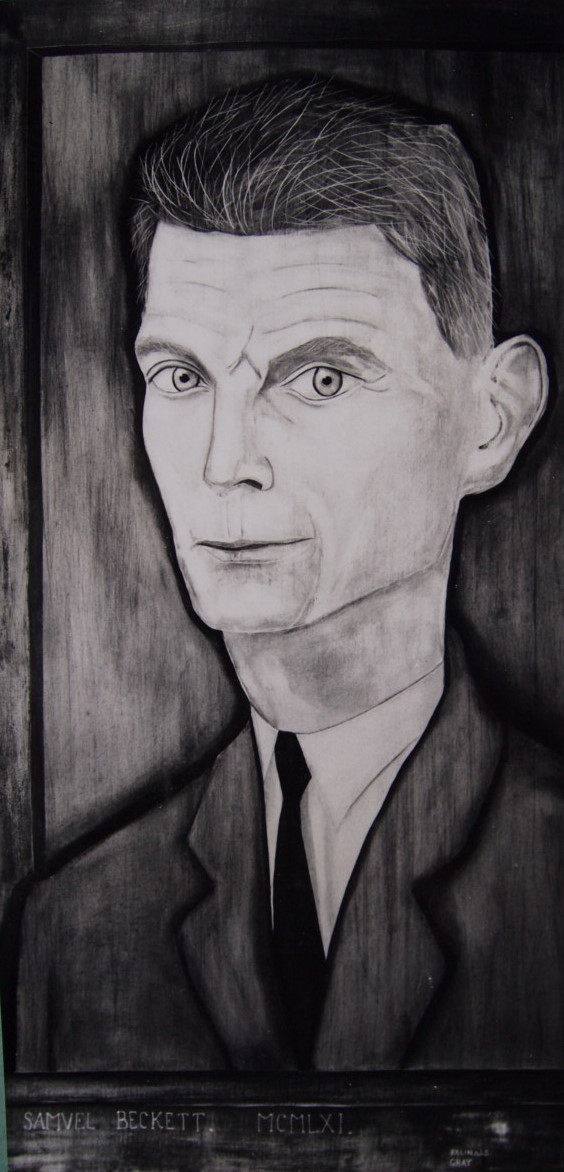
- Samuel Beckett who derived the libretto from his play, portrait by Reginald Gray, 1961
- Librettist: Samuel Beckett
- Language: French; English; German
- Based on: Beckett's Krapp's Last Tape
- Premiere: 3 July 1961 (French); Théâtre des Nations, Paris

Krapp, ou, La dernière bande (English: The Last Tape, German: Krapp, oder Das letzte Band) is a chamber opera in one act by Marcel Mihalovici with a libretto by Samuel Beckett. The libretto is based on Beckett's 1958 play Krapp's Last Tape, and large portions of the play's script were lifted for use in the libretto. Like the play, the opera is a monologue with the only character being that of Krapp. The opera was commissioned jointly by the Radiodiffusion-Télévision Française and the Bielefeld Opera, Germany. From the very beginning the opera's libretto has existed in three different languages: English (from the original play), French (for the French premiere) and German (for the German premiere). It premiered using the French-language version on RTF radio on 15 May 1961 and had its stage debut in Paris on 3 July 1961 at the Théâtre des Nations. The original stage production was performed by visiting artists from the Städtische Bühnen, notably American baritone William Dooley singing the title role. The work was next performed at the Städtische Bühnen in February 1962 with Dooley singing the role in German.

Krapp, ou, La dernière bande received its United Kingdom premiere on 7 May 1999 with the BBC Symphony Orchestra conducted by Diego Masson with the baritone David Barrell in the title role. The performance was at the BBC Studios at Maida Vale in London, where it was recorded for a future radio broadcast on 10 September on BBC Radio 3 as part of a wide-ranging festival of Beckett's work in London. In 2003 the work was performed at the National Theatre in Prague with the National Theater Opera Orchestra and baritone Ivan Kusnjer as Krapp.

== Composing the opera ==
Mihalovici had asked Beckett if he would write a new libretto for him. Beckett agreed but, not unsurprisingly, found he was unable to write to order. Instead, he persuaded Mihalovici to write music for an existing work and the composer "chose La Dernière Bande because of the new musical possibilities involved in a character who must sing as both a young and an old man, and whose voice on tape must be accompanied by a live orchestra."

It took some fourteen months for the Krapp: ou La dernière bande, a score of almost 260 pages, to be completed. From that point, according to James Knowlson, "Beckett and his German translator Elmar Tophoven … [literally] sat at the piano, one on either side of the composer, adapting the text to the music or modifying the score … Beckett sometimes changed his original English text to provide extra 'notes' or different rhythms: so, [for example,] 'incomparable bosom' became 'a bosom beyond compare'."

"Mihalovici's music is atonal, sparse and highly descriptive, relying heavily on a huge percussion battery to paint a pungent landscape for Beckett's moods and words. Beats on wooden blocks suggest a human heartbeat, a swirling celesta the dizziness of inebriation, muted trumpets a nauseating anxiety. Inner torture and pain are revealed through the orchestra as Krapp intones Sprechgesang in the present; a lyrical vocal line caresses the pre-recorded monologues of his younger self. The melody for the section of tape which Krapp rewinds and re-listens to numerous times (his happiest moment, curled up with his lover in a gently rocking boat) is ingeniously captured as an idée fixe by Mihalovici."
