= Global Village Video =

Former Manhattan-based media center

Global Village Video (Global Village Video Resource Center) was a pioneering Manhattan-based media center that operated from the late 1960s to the 1980s. It produced and showcased "Guerrilla TV" style video documentaries that featured subject matter and stylistic qualities not seen on mainstream television of the period. Using the battery-operated Sony CV video portapak introduced in 1968, Global Village also trained numerous artists and activists in the new technology, launched the first major video and film festival devoted solely to documentaries, as well as spearheaded a movement to get the work of independent producers on public television.

== Media Productions ==
Global Village Video was formed by video artist/documentarian John Reilly and kinetic artist Rudi Stern in 1969. At the time of their meeting Reilly had just completed a series of tapes documenting the Woodstock Festival with co-collaborator Ira Schneider (who later served as president of Raindance Foundation, 1972–1994). Reilly, Schneider, and Stern partnered to establish “the first closed-circuit video theater to show underground [video] work,” to be called The Global Village Video Center. Their first event consisted of a bank of ten monitors on which they presented "a live mix program featuring music performed at Woodstock, President Nixon speaking on the war in Vietnam, the Black Panthers, student protestors and a couple having sex in a field." The 2013 New York Times Obituary for Reilly states that the early Global Village Video “shows” “amounted to a counter cultural feast: regular visitors included Abbie Hoffman, Jerry Rubin, and Timothy Leary. In 1971, the magazine Art in America called it "the only commercial outlet for underground video.” Reilly, Schneider, and Stern also featured the works of several other innovative video artists. Rolling Stone wrote that Global Village's media environments juxtapose "political, rock, erotic, and humorous tapes on ten monitors which are constantly switching." A Global Village "video environment" called Innertube was included in the 1970 exhibit "Vision and Television" at Brandeis University's Rose Art Museum, the first group video exhibition to appear in a museum. In an interview in Radical Software, Reilly and Stern said, "What emerges is a matrix of politics, morals and [the] sounds of a generation." Of those early videos, Newsweek wrote that they were "crude but intimate in form, blunt and radical in content" and that they "carry an intimacy that is rare in establishment TV." The theater soon after moved to Broome Street in Lower Manhattan, where it also began holding video production workshops upon receiving a grant from the New York State Council for the Arts to support the creative use of video. Other early video works include tapes of political figures like Hoffman, Rubin, Paul Krassner, Jim Fouratt, and Afeni Shakur, concert footage of popular musicians like Jimi Hendrix, Johnny Winters, and Phil Ochs, and abstract or non-narrative compositions, including John and Samantha Making Love. Transcripts for some of these video interviews conducted by Reilly and Stern were published in the East Village Other, where both were regular contributors. In 1969, Reilly made a video portrait of fellow East Village Other writer, "Dylanologist" A.J. Weberman, recording Weberman as he dug through and analyzed the trash outside of what he believed to be Bob Dylan's New York apartment.

In 1971 Global Village Video partnered with The New School for Social Research to offer courses on community video production. Through these courses Reilly met Stefan Moore, and they collaborated on the experimental documentary The Irish Tapes about The Troubles in Northern Ireland. The Irish Tapes was partially funded by John Lennon and Yoko Ono, and it was featured in the 1975 “Video and Television Review” series produced by New York City’s WNET/Channel 13 Television Laboratory. The New York Times saw The Irish Tapes as being exemplary of the new style of video documentary that "makes no pretensions to objectivity. Tightly controlled by a few people or even one person, the documentary tends to be extremely suggested. For The Irish Tapes, for example, several trips to Ulster were made. Scenes of hate and suffering, on both sides of the conflict, were set in a form that opens and ends with glimpses of a St. Patrick's Day parade in New York. Grim reality is powerfully counterpointed with uniformed fantasy. The 'troubles' are portrayed by the participants – defiant, hysterical, puzzled." The documentary has been included in the permanent collection of The Museum of Modern Art.

In 1972, Julie Gustafson enrolled in a Global Village Video course, which resulted in the acclaimed video documentary The Politics of Intimacy (1973). This project was the starting point of Gustafson and Reilly’s multi-decade collaboration, during which they co-produced and co-directed a number of award-winning video documentaries that were aired on PBS. The 1975 documentary Giving Birth: Four Portraits (1975), co-produced by WNET, received the award for "Best Video Documentary" at the 1977 Chicago International Film Festival. The documentary, which follows four couples who have each chosen a different delivery method, including one couple that is having their baby at home, utilizing Frederic Leboyer's "birth without violence" techniques. It features interviews with Leboyer as well as Dr. Elizabeth Bing, pioneer of the Lamaze technique. Although it received positive reviews, one reviewer noting that it "exudes the astonishment and initial elation characteristic of most new parents" and another calling it "a sensitive, intelligent program", the documentary's depiction of childbirth in unobscured detail was controversial. Home (1979) employs a similar structure, following four different families experiencing major life events as a means of portraying the changing nature of homes and family relations. It received positive reviews, called an "offbeat, mixed-focus, refreshingly conceived" with one critic noting that "might easily have made the major network documentary slots... if the major networks... accepted the work of independent producers." Other productions include Joe Albert’s Fox Hunt and Other Stories from the Pine Barrens of New Jersey (1979), The Pursuit of Happiness (1984), and The Trial of the AVCO Plowshares (1986). Pursuit of Happiness looks at the carceral system's effects on the happiness of the people affected by it, including inmates, prison workers, and activists, and their families. It was the first Global Village documentary to feature Molly Rush and the Plowshares activists, whose trial would become the subject of The Trial of the AVCO Plowshares. That documentary chronicled the activists' trial for entering into a manufacturing plant of the AVCO Systems Division and damaging parts and equipment that would be used to make nuclear weapons. Howard Zinn testified for the defense, making a case for the importance of non-violent civil disobedience in the history of American democracy.

From 1978 through the 1980s Gustafson served as co-director of Global Village Video alongside Reilly, and between them they received numerous awards and honors related to their video making and teaching activities, including fellowships from the National Endowment for the Arts, the New York State Council on the Arts, a Guggenheim Fellowship, as well as grants from the Corporation for Public Broadcasting, the Rockefeller Foundation, the Sony Corporation of America, the Ford Foundation, and The John D. and Catherine T. MacArthur Foundation.

In 1992, Gustafson directed Casting the First Stone, her highest profile and most widely acclaimed documentary, which was broadcast on PBS's POV series. The documentary was praised by critics for its balanced, complex portrayal of abortion providers and reproductive health workers at the Women's Suburban Clinic in Paoli, Pennsylvania as well as the clinic's protesters, including Randall Terry, who attempted to shut down the clinic.

Starting in the late 1980s, Global Village produced a series of videos about or adapting the work of Samuel Beckett. Those include the short videos collected as part of the 1992 documentary presentation Peephole Art: Beckett for Television, directed by Reilly and Melissa Shaw-Smith: What Where (1988), with theater direction by S.E. Gontarski at the Magic Theatre in San Francisco; Not I (1989), with theater direction by Lawrence Sacharow; and Quad I + II (1988), adaptations by the Suzanne Lek Dance Company. What Where was produced with the assistance of Beckett, who offered feedback on the staging and video effects over video from Paris. Reilly and Shaw-Smith also directed the documentary Waiting for Beckett (1994), the first American documentary on the writer. Waiting for Beckett chronicles Beckett's life and work, including footage of dozens of stage, television, and film productions. It also includes behind-the-scenes footage of Beckett working on the Global Village production of What Where. It received positive critical notices, with critic Robert Koehler saying that it "is sure to stand as one of the lasting records Samuel Beckett's life and work." The 1990 film Waiting for Godot in San Quentin documents a production of Beckett's play Waiting for Godot in San Quentin State Prison, directed by Jan Jonson. The documentary follows Jonson and his incarcerated performers, "Happy" Wilson and "Twin" James, as they rehearse for and stage the play for an audience that includes actor Bill Irwin, who had received great acclaim for his own recent performance in an off-Broadway staging of the play.

In 2005, Gustafson released Desire, a documentary that she directed in collaboration with members of the Teenage Girls Documentary Project. The documentary profiled a group of teenage girls in New Orleans from a variety of backgrounds, with the girls contributing their own short videos about their lives that are interspersed throughout. Those young filmmakers – Tiffanie Johnson, Tracy Morton, Kimeca Rodgers, Cassandra Swaing, and Peggy Wang – use Gustafson's documentary and their short videos to discuss their lives, their goals, their loves, and their families. Three of the girls are single mothers, and they speak openly about the extreme difficulties they are experiencing as they try to do their school work and prepare for the future while being caring, supportive mothers for their young children. The film received very positive reviews, including an endorsement from acclaimed documentary filmmaker Barbara Kopple, who said of Desire that it is "a film so full of spirit and life you don't want it to end."

== Documentary Festival ==
Global Village held screening programs much longer lived than those of other early video groups such as The People's Video Theater or Raindance. In addition to regular fall and spring screening series, Reilly created the Global Village Annual Documentary Festival in 1974, and Gustafson joined him in producing the event for the next 15 years (1975–1989). The Global Village Annual Documentary Festival was hosted in its later years by Joseph Papp’s Public Theater and The Museum of Modern Art. The festival was recognized as one of several important initiatives launched by Global Village Video to support independent and socially committed documentary. Renee Tajima-Peña wrote in The Village Voice in 1989: “For years Global Village has promoted the documentary under a banner of urgency, ‘the endangered species.’"

== Independent Television Workshops ==
Between 1976 and 1981, Gustafson and Reilly also collaborated on “The Independent Producer, Public Television and the New Video Technologies,” a national series of workshops bringing information on new video technologies and networking opportunities for public television programmers and independent producers. These workshops helped lay the groundwork for the current golden age of independent documentary production and distribution in public TV, cable and the Internet. The workshops were funded by The Corporation for Public Broadcasting, the Rockefeller Foundation, the Sony Corporation, and the National Endowment for the Arts, and they helped establish Global Village Video as a vital advocate for independent video artists and producers working in public television.
