= Frédérick Leboyer =

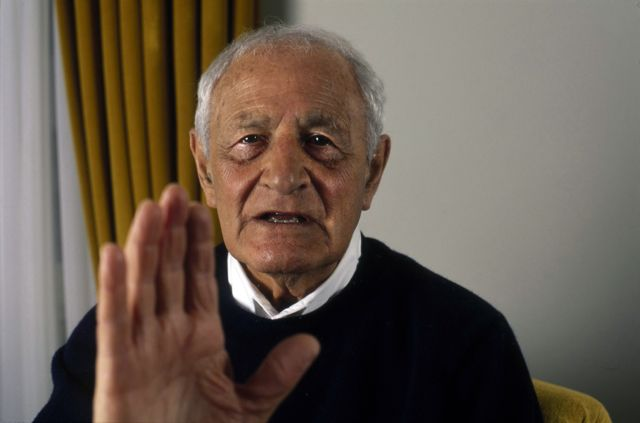
- Leboyer in 1996
- Born: 1 November 1918; Paris, France
- Died: 25 May 2017 (aged 98); Vens, Switzerland
- Education: University of Paris
- Occupations: Obstetrician, author, activist
- Works: Birth Without Violence

Frédérick Leboyer (1 November 1918 – 25 May 2017) was a French obstetrician and author. He is best known for his 1975 book, Birth Without Violence, which popularized gentle birthing techniques. He also advocated low lighting and quiet in a warm room to limit the supposed shock of birth,[Reynolds, Concise Encyclopedia of Special Education, 138] and that a newborn be laid on its mother's stomach and allowed to bond, instead of being taken away for tests.

== Birth ==
Leboyer graduated from the University of Paris School of Medicine. His own birth was traumatic and without anesthetics available, his mother had to be pinned down. Leboyer attributes his interest in birth to this experience.

== Water births ==
Leboyer is often mistaken as a proponent for water births. Although Leboyer's disciple, Michel Odent, became known for introducing birthing pools in hospitals as an option for lower lumbar pain management. As a consequence, water births were seen as a birthing method that he encouraged. Odent has stated that being submerged in water longer than 2 hours can decrease the progress of labor. Odent developed an effective method of reducing pain in the lower lumbar region. Informed by the Gate Control Theory of Pain, Odent injected sterile water underneath the skin surface in the lumbar region. This technique produced a localized source of pain, which in turn reduced the more severe regional pain women experienced in the lower lumbar region during labor. Because this method of non-pharmacological pain management could be viewed as too simple, Odent introduced the birthing pool which could deliver a similar form of pain management. Many sources mistakenly attribute a belief that humans should birth in water to Michel Odent. He has stated that this option is possible, however he does not promote any method, he only points to information to better understand any method. Leboyer himself was against the idea of waterbirth.

Making love is the sovereign remedy for anguish.
— Frédérick Leboyer, in Birth Without Violence (1975), p. 62

Leboyer speaks at length about his philosophy of "birth without violence" in the 1975 documentary Giving Birth: Four Portraits.

== Death ==
Leboyer died on 25 May 2017 at the age of 98.

== Family ==
Frédérick Leboyer was the uncle of prominent French psychiatrist Marion Leboyer.

== Bibliography ==
- Birth Without Violence (1975)
- Shantala: un art traditionnel, le massage des enfants / Loving Hands: The Traditional Art of Baby Massage (1976)
- Inner Beauty, Inner Light (1978)
- Si l'enfantement m'était conté (1996)
- Birth Without Violence (DVD, re-released 2008 through New Earth Records)

== See also ==
- Michel Odent, French physician who popularized the practice of water birth
- Bradley method of natural childbirth
- Pre- and perinatal psychology
