= Molloy (novel) =

Novel by Samuel Beckett

- 1955 Grove Press edition
- Author: Samuel Beckett
- Translator: Patrick Bowles, in collaboration with the author
- Language: French
- Series: The Trilogy #1
- Genre: Novel
- Publisher: Les Éditions de Minuit (French); Grove Press (English)
- Publication date: French, 1951; English, 1955
- Publication place: France
- Followed by: Malone Dies (Malone Meurt)

Molloy is a novel by Samuel Beckett first written in French and published by Paris-based Les Éditions de Minuit in 1951. The English translation, published in 1955, is by Beckett and Patrick Bowles.

== As part of the Trilogy ==
Molloy is the first of three novels initially written in Paris between 1947 and 1950; this trio, which includes Malone Dies and The Unnamable, is collectively referred to as 'The Trilogy' or 'the Beckett Trilogy'. Beckett wrote all three books in French and then, aside from some collaborative work on Molloy with Patrick Bowles, served entirely as his own English-language translator; he did the same for most of his plays. As Paul Auster explains, "Beckett’s renderings of his own work are never literal, word-by-word transcriptions. They are free, highly-inventive adaptations of the original text—or, perhaps more accurately, 'repatriations' from one language to the other, from one culture to the other. In effect, he wrote every book twice, and each version bears its own indelible mark." The three thematically-related books are dark existentialist comedies "whose ostensible subject is death", but, as Salman Rushdie asserts, "are in fact books about life, the lifelong battle of life against its shadow, life shown near battle’s end, bearing its lifetime of scars". As the books progress, the prose becomes increasingly bare and stripped down, and as Benjamin Kunkel notes, they "[have] become famous in the history of fiction because of what is left out: the usual novelistic apparatus of plot, scenes, and characters. … Here, it seems, is the novelistic equivalent of abstract painting."

== Plot summary ==
The novel is about two characters and is divided into two parts. Each part is an internal monologue, the first of Molloy and the second of Jacques Moran.

Part One consists of two paragraphs: the first spans about two pages and the second more than eighty. The book opens with the narrator stating that he lives in his mother's room, but does not remember how he arrived there or when his mother died. In this room he writes and every Sunday a man visits to pick up what he has written and bring back what he had taken last week "marked with signs" that Molloy never cares to read. Molloy writes to "speak of the things that are left, say [his] goodbyes, finish dying". In the second paragraph, which comprises most of Part One, Molloy recounts a journey he took supposedly to find his mother. Throughout the journey, he struggles to remember that his aim is to meet his mother and finds himself endlessly sidetracked and delayed. Molloy suffers from severe physical disabilities, and so relies on his bicycle and his crutches for mobility. At one point, he gets momentarily arrested for resting on his bicycle in a lewd way. It is when speaking to the police in the station that we finally learn his name, which suddenly comes to him and he cries out while being questioned. Soon after his release, Molloy wanders through town and accidentally kills an old dog by running over it with his bicycle. A vicious mob starts forming, but then Molloy is rescued by the dog's owner who forgives him and takes him into her home. He is fed, bathed, clothed, and allowed to live on the premises for free. Despite this, Molloy resents the woman—whose name he can't quite remember: "a Mrs Loy... or Lousse, I forget, Christian name something like Sophie"—and after a long time finally musters the determination to leave, without his bicycle. Soon afterwards, he finds a place in an alley to harm himself, which brings him satisfaction. He remembers an old woman who used to compensate him for having intercourse with her and with whom he considers, absurdly, to have known true love. Molloy then journeys out of town towards the shore, having again forgotten his objective of finding his mother. He tells of living by the ocean for a while and describes in excruciating detail his process of circulating sixteen "sucking stones" across his four pockets to maximize the amount of time between which each stone is sucked. Eventually he leaves the shore and journeys through the woods. There, he encounters a man who appears to need help but Molloy ignores him. The man insists until Molloy becomes suddenly violent, beating the man until he stops moving. Soon afterwards, Molloy makes it out of the woods and Part One abruptly ends.

Part Two is narrated by a private detective by the name of Jacques Moran, who is assigned the task of tracking down Molloy and carrying out specific instructions. The task is given to him by a man named Gaber, who is apparently his supervisor and takes order from a higher boss named Youdi. This narrative (Part Two) begins:

It is midnight. The rain is beating on the windows.

It becomes immediately apparent that Moran is a cruel and arbitrarily abusive father. He sets out on his journey to find Molloy and forces his son Jacques to come with him. They wander across the countryside, increasingly bogged down by the weather, decreasing supplies of food and Moran's suddenly failing body. He sends his son to purchase a bicycle and while his son is gone, Moran encounters an old man with a large, but light walking stick. Later, Moran is confronted by another man, who he murders in a sudden violent outburst reminiscent of Molloy and hides his body in the forest. After a few days, the son returns with a bicycle and is aghast at his father's appearance. Immediately, Moran resumes his senseless, violent treatment of his son and the two continue on their journey to Bally. In the outskirts of Bally, they encounter a shepherd with his dog and sheep. For some reason, Moran is transfixed and enchanted. In the morning, Moran wakes to find that his son has fled with the bicycle and most of the money. Moran takes the news with strange warmth and optimism. Moran finishes his provisions and gives up on his journey. He waits for starvation to kill him. Every night, he crawls out of his camp to look at the lights of Bally in the distance and "laughs" strenuously at the sight of it. One night, Moran finds Gaber outside his camp. They have an absurd exchange in which Moran pleads with Gaber to divulge what Youdi said. Gaber disappears quickly thereafter. Moran then embarks on what he understands to be his new assignment, returning home. He limps and drags himself through the countryside through the fall and winter at an excruciatingly slow pace and poses bizarre questions to himself about biblical topics and matters of the church. His ramblings begin to resemble Molloy's from Part One. During his journey home, he is confronted by an angry farmer who demands to know what he is doing on his land. Feeling that preferred strategy of violence is too risky, Moran makes up a story about doing a pilgrimage and requests a tea to send the farmer away so that he can escape. When Moran finally arrives home, several months later, he laments the death of his bees and hens, which were left out all winter. He settles back into his home and begins to use crutches, like Molloy. Not for the first time, Moran mentions a "voice" that has been gradually speaking to him more and more, and which he claims to understand better now. The novel ends with Moran sitting down to write the report that his boss Youdi, his supervisor Gaber, and the mysterious voice keep demanding he write:

Then I went back into the house and wrote, It is midnight. The rain is beating on the windows. It was not midnight. It was not raining.

== Characters in Molloy ==
- Molloy is a vagrant, currently bedridden; it appears he is a seasoned veteran in vagrancy, reflecting that "To him who has nothing it is forbidden not to relish filth". He is surprisingly well-educated, having studied geography and anthropology, among other things, and seems to know something of "old Geulincx" (the 17th-century post-Cartesian occasionalist philosopher). He has a number of bizarre habits, not least of which is the sucking of pebbles, described by Beckett in a long and detailed passage, and also having an odd and rather morbid attachment to his mother (who may or may not be dead).
- Moran is a private detective, with a housekeeper, Martha, and son, Jacques, both of whom he treats with scorn. He is pedantic and extremely ordered, pursuing the task set him logically, to the point of absurdity, expressing fear that his son will catch him masturbating and being an extreme disciplinarian. He also shows an insincere reverence for the church and deference to the local priest. As the novel progresses, his body begins to fail for no visible or specified reason, a fact that surprises him, and his mind begins to decline to the point of insanity. This similarity in bodily and mental decline leads readers to believe that Molloy and Moran are in fact two facets of the same personality, or that the section narrated by Molloy is actually written by Moran.
- Molloy's Mother though never seen alive, Molloy's Mother is mentioned at various points in the chapter; her house being both the destination of the journey he describes as well as his residence while writing it. Molloy refers to her as Mag as "the letter g abolished the syllable Ma, and as it were spat on it, better than any other letter would have done". He communicates with her using a knocking method (as she is apparently both deaf and blind) where he hits her on the head with the knuckle of his index finger: "One knock meant yes, two no, three I don't know, four money, five goodbye". At times this seems more of an excuse to be violent towards her; when asking for money he would replace the knocks with "one or more (according to my needs) thumps of the fist, on her skull". He seems to hold extreme contempt for his mother both for her condition and for the fact she failed to kill him during her pregnancy.

== Literary significance and legacy ==
The Trilogy is generally considered to be one of the most important literary works of the 20th century, and the most important non-dramatic work in Beckett's oeuvre.

Novelist Tim Parks, writing in The Telegraph, described its influence on him: "Molloy entirely changed my sense of what could be done with literature. You have a wonderfully engaging, comic voice remembering distant events in the narrator's life – an attempt to find his mother to ask her for money – yet as you read, every ordinary assumption one has about novels is stripped away from you, the setting, the identity of the characters, the time scheme, the reality of events themselves. In the end, nothing is certain but that the voice will go on trying to put a life together and make sense of it until death calls time on the tale."

Comparing Molloy with the novels that preceded it, The New York Times wrote that the experience was "to marvel anew at the velocity and drive of the prose. The energy is suddenly urgent and channeled into an exploration of an inner landscape, a passionate and obsessive investigation of being."

In an interview, Brian Evenson said: "I tend to think contemporary American fiction would be more interesting if more writers knew Molloy".

Vladimir Nabokov considered it one of his favorites of Beckett's books.

Passages from the novel are spoken by a possessed character in Annihilation, directed by Alex Garland and based on the Southern Reach Trilogy by Jeff VanderMeer.

== Allusions/references to other works ==
Molloy includes references to a number of Beckett's other works, especially the characters, who are revealed as fictional characters in the same manner as Molloy and Moran: "Oh the stories I could tell you if I were easy. What a rabble in my head, what a gallery of moribunds. Murphy, Watt, Yerk, Mercier and all the others." (Part II)

Imagery from Dante is present throughout the novel, as in much of Beckett's work. In Part I, Molloy compares himself to Belacqua from the Purgatorio, Canto IV and Sordello from the Purgatorio, Canto VI. There are also Molloy's frequent references to the various positions of the sun, which calls to mind similar passages in the Purgatorio. Belacqua is also the name of the central character in Beckett's More Pricks Than Kicks.

== Publication details ==
- French original: Paris: Éditions de Minuit, 1951.
- English: 1955, Paris: Olympia Press, paperback; NY: Grove Press.
- Included in Three Novels. NY: Grove Press, 1959.
- In The Grove Centenary Edition, Vol. II: Novels. NY: Grove Press, 2006.

== BBC broadcast ==
A reading of selected passages from Part 1 of Molloy was broadcast on the BBC Third Programme on 10 December 1957, and repeated on 13 December. Beckett selected the passages, which were read by the actor Patrick Magee, and incidental music, performed by the Philip Jones Brass Ensemble, was composed by Samuel's cousin John S. Beckett. The producer was Donald McWhinnie.

== Unabridged audiobook ==
Individual unabridged audiobooks of the entire Beckett Trilogy were released by Naxos Audiobooks between 2003 and 2005. Molloy (2003) is read by actors Dermot Crowley and Sean Barrett, who each deliver one of the book's two monologues. Malone Dies (2004) and The Unnamable (2005) are read by Sean Barrett. The production of Molloy has been praised for its accessibility: "The distinct readings lend the book a dramatic presence, playfully yet skillfully rendering all the characters to illuminate Beckett's irony. So while in print it seems dark, even absurd, in audio this work takes on the full richness of comedy, probably as Beckett, preeminently a dramatist, intended."

== See also ==
- Depersonalization
