= A Dream of Fair Women =

Poem by Alfred Tennyson

A Dream of Fair Women is a poem by Alfred Tennyson. It was written and published in 1833 as "A Legend of Fair Women", but was heavily revised for republication under its present title in 1842.

The opening lines of the poem are:

As when a man, that sails in a balloon,
Downlooking sees the solid shining ground.
Stream from beneath him in the broad blue noon,
Tilth, hamlet, mead and mound …

The poem was inspired by Geoffrey Chaucer's The Legend of Good Women (1384). Both works feature Cleopatra and deal with the misfortunes of illustrious women.

Samuel Beckett's 1932 Dream of Fair to Middling Women parodies Tennyson's title and alludes to his and Chaucer's poems.

A 1920 American short film with this title directed by Wilfrid North credits Tennyson. The film features four winners of the Motion Picture Classic magazine's 1919 "Fame and Fortune" contest, which included Virginia Brown Faire.
