= Marcel Mihalovici =

French composer (1898–1985)

Marcel Mihalovici (Bucharest, 22 October 1898 – Paris, 12 August 1985) was a French composer born in Romania. He was discovered by George Enescu in Bucharest. He moved to Paris in 1919 (at age 21) to study under Vincent d'Indy. His works include his Sonata number 1 for violin and piano (1920), Mélusine opera (1920, libretto by Yvan Goll), his 1st string quartet (1923), 2nd string quartet (1931), Sonata number 2 for violin and piano (1941), Sonata for violin and cello (1944), Phèdre Opera (1949), Étude in two parts for piano and instrumental ensemble (1951) and Esercizio per archi (1960). Many of his piano works were first performed by his wife, the concert pianist Monique Haas.

Mihalovici was the original composer for the music of Samuel Beckett's radio play Cascando (1962). His Fifth Symphony features a soprano singing a setting of a Beckett poem, and he used Krapp's Last Tape as the basis for a small opera, Krapp, ou, La dernière bande. His memories of their friendship are recounted in the collected work Beckett at Sixty A Festschrift by John Calder, Calder and Boyars (1967).

A strong proponent of neoclassicism, during his career Mihalovici embraced a variety of contemporary styles, with a harmonic language ranging from chromaticism to serialism. Romanian folk music influenced his unconventional use of rhythmic variation and instrumental colour.

== List of Works (by opus number) ==
(Works with "op. ??" are placed at the point in the list where they are presumed to have been composed)

- op. 6 – Three Nocturnes; piano
- op. 11 – Sonatine; piano
- op. 12 – Dialogues; clarinet and piano
- op. 13 – Sonatine; oboe or violin and piano
- op. 18 – Chansons et Jeux (Romanian Poems); voice and piano
- op. 19 – Impromptu Pieces; piano
- op. ?? – Sonata no. 1; violin and piano
- op. ?? – String Quartet no. 1
- op. 23 – Karagueuz; puppet ballet for orchestra or 4-hand piano
- op. 25 - Trois romances de Victor Hugo, piano and voice, published 1932
- op. 26 – Fantaisie for orchestra (performed at the 1930 ISCM Festival in Liège)
- op. 27 – The Intransigent Pluto, or, Orpheus in the Underworld; opera in one act
- op. 28 – Chindia; radio-orchestra
- op. 29 – Four Caprices; piano
- op. 30 – Trio 'Serenade'; violin, viola, and cello
- op. 31 – String Quartet no. 2
- op. 32 – Chanson, Pastorale, Rumanian Dance; piano
- op. 33 – Concerto (Quasi una Fantasia); violin and orchestra
- op. 35 – Sonata; clarinet trio (E-flat, A, and bass clarinet in B-flat)
- op. 37 – Five Bagatelles; piano
- op. 38 – Divertissement; small orchestra
- op. 40 – Rhapsody Concertante; orchestra
- op. 42 – Prelude and Invention; string orchestra
- op. 44 – Toccata; piano and orchestra (or 2 pianos)
- op. 45 – Sonata no. 2; violin and piano
- op. 46 – Ricarcari, Variations; piano
- op. 47 – Sonata; viola and piano
- op. ?? – Sequences; orchestra
- op. 50 – Sonata; violin and cello
- op. 51 – Counter-Rhymes, 3 songs; voice and piano
- op. 52 – String Quartet no. 3
- op. 54 – Variations; horns and strings
- op. 58 – Phèdre; opera in five scenes
- op. 59 – Sonata; solo violin
- op. 60 – Sonata; solo cello
- op. 61 – Ritournelles; orchestra
- op. 62 – Four Pastorales; piano
- op. 63 – Three Nocturnes; piano
- op. 64 – Etude in Two Parties; piano, winds, brass, celeste, and percussion
- op. 65 – Sinfonia giocosa (Symphony no. 1); orchestra
- op. 66 – Sinfonia partita (Symphony no. 2); string orchestra
- op. 67 – Two Poems by Agrippa D'Aubigne; SATB chorus
- op. 68 – Memorial (Five Motets); chorus
- op. ?? – Symphonies for Present Times; orchestra
- op. 70 – The Homecoming; opera in one act
- op. 71 – Trio; oboe, clarinet, and bassoon
- op. 72 – Elegy; orchestra
- op. 73 – Scenes from Thésée (Ballet); orchestra
- op. 74 – Alternamenti (Ballet); orchestra
- op. 75 – Evening Songs, Four Poems by Yvan Goll; voice and piano
- op. 76 – Tragic Overture; orchestra
- op. ?? – Sonata; bassoon and piano
- op. 78 – Sonata; B-flat clarinet and piano
- op. ?? – Scherzo-Waltz; B-flat trumpet and piano
- op. ?? – Meditation; C or B-flat trumpet and piano
- op. ?? – Novelette; bassoon and piano
- op. ?? – Episode; Horn in F and piano
- op. 80 – Exercise; string orchestra
- op. 81 – Krapp's Last Tape (Beckett); opera
- op. 82 – Sinfonia variata (Symphony no. 3); orchestra
- op. 83 – Improvisations; percussion and piano
- op. 84 – The Twins; opera in three acts
- op. 87 – Musique Nocturne; clarinet and chamber orchestra
- op. 88 – Sinfonia Cantata (Symphony no. 4); baritone, mixed chorus, and orchestra
- op. 89 – Aubade; string orchestra
- op. 90 – Sonata; piano
- op. 92 – Dialogues; clarinet and piano
- op. 93 – Périples; small orchestra
- op. 94 – Symphony no. 5 (in memory of Hans Rosbaud)
- op. 95 – Pretexts; oboe, bass clarinet, piano, percussion, and strings
- op. 96 – Variantes; F horn and piano
- op. 97 – Cantus Firmus; two pianos
- op. 98 – Rondo; orchestra
- op. 99 – Serioso; bass saxhorn and piano
- op. 100 – Cantilène; mezzo-soprano and chamber orchestra
- op. 101 – Recit; solo clarinet
- op. 102 – Melopeia; oboe solo
- op. 103 – Chant Premier (Sonata); tenor saxophone and orchestra
- op. 104 – Texts; viola and piano
- op. 105 – Passacaglia for One Hand; piano
- op. 106 – Follia, Paraphrases; orchestra
- op. 107 – Délié (Cantata); soprano and orchestra (or piano)
- op. 108 – Sonata-Danse; cello and piano
- op. 109 – Malinconia (Cantata); soprano, bass, string quartet, and orchestra
- op. 110 – Sonata; viola solo
- op. 111 – String Quartet no. 4
- op. 112 – Mirror of Songs; flute and piano
- op. 113 – Torse (Meditation); violin solo
- op. 114 – Elegy no. 2; violin and piano
