= The Legend of Good Women =

Middle English poem by Chaucer

The Legend of Good Women is a poem in the form of a dream vision by Geoffrey Chaucer during the fourteenth century.

The poem is the third longest of Chaucer's works, after The Canterbury Tales and Troilus and Criseyde, and is possibly the first significant work in English to use the iambic pentameter or decasyllabic couplets which he later used throughout The Canterbury Tales. This form of the heroic couplet would become a significant part of English literature possibly inspired by Chaucer.

== Summary ==
=== Prologue ===
The prologue describes how Chaucer is reprimanded by the god of love and his queen, Alceste, for his works—such as Troilus and Criseyde—depicting women in a poor light. Criseyde is made to seem inconstant in love in that earlier work, and Alceste demands a poem of Chaucer extolling the virtues of women and their good deeds.

For thy trespas, and understond hit here:
Thou shalt, whyl that thou livest, yeer by yere,
The moste party of thy tyme spende
In making of a glorious Legende
Of Gode Wommen, maidenes and wyves,
That weren trewe in lovinge al hir lyves;
And telle of false men that hem bitrayen,
That al hir lyf ne doon nat but assayen

The incomplete nature of the poem is suggested by Chaucer's Retraction from The Canterbury Tales which calls the work the xxv. Ladies. Fifteen and nineteen are also numbers used to describe the work. In the prologue several women are mentioned—Esther, Penelope, Marcia Catonis (wife of Cato the younger), Lavinia, Polyxena and Laodamia—whose stories are not recorded and the nineteen ladies in waiting of Alceste mentioned in the prologue might suggest an unfulfilled structure.

The command of queen Alceste is said, by John Lydgate in The Fall of Princes, to be a poetic account of an actual request for a poem by Anne of Bohemia who came to England in 1382 to marry Richard II. If true this would make Chaucer an early poet laureate. Joan of Kent, Richard's mother, is also sometimes considered a model for Alceste. The supposed royal command is one suggested reason for the poem's unfinished state as Chaucer got bored with the task and gave up. Several passages hint at Chaucer's dissatisfaction:

But for I am agroted [stuffed] heer-biforn
To wryte of hem that been in love forsworn,
And eek to haste me in my legende,
Which to performe god me grace sende,
Therfor I passe shortly in this wyse;

These lines, late in the poem, could simply be occupatio or paralipsis, the rhetorical device common in Chaucer of bringing up a subject merely to say you will not mention it.

Whether the poem's state is due to Chaucer becoming bored with it is uncertain, but it is not regarded among his best work, despite being popular when first written. One early fan is Chaucer's own character, the Man of Law, who praises Chaucer and the poem which he calls Seintes Legende of Cupide. The work is rather inconsistent in tone, with tragedy mixed uncomfortably with comedy, and the legends are all somewhat similar with little of the characterisation which is key to The Canterbury Tales. Some scholars have conjectured that the work is deliberately poorly written and the work is actually a satire against women although this is not widely agreed with. Another idea is that it is a satire on the idea of taking stories of classical origin and twisting them to give them contemporary moral meanings. This would suggest that the poem is not only an early use of heroic couplets but also one of the first mock-heroic works in English.

The nature of the poem with its separate legends makes dating it difficult but it is clearly placed between Troilus and the Tales around 1386/1388. Chaucer seems to have returned to the work a decade later to rewrite the prologue, but the latter text, which survives in only one manuscript, is generally considered inferior to the original.

A thousand tymes have I herd men telle,
That ther is Ioye in heven, and peyne in helle;
And I acorde wel that hit is so;
But natheles, yit wot I wel also,
That ther nis noon dwelling in this contree,
That either hath in heven or helle y-be,

Tennyson used the poem as theme for his own poem A Dream of Fair Women.

=== Legends ===
The poet recounts ten stories of virtuous women in nine sections: Cleopatra, Thisbe, Medea, Phyllis, Hypsipyle, Ariadne, Lucretia, Philomene, Hypermnestra, Dido. The work is similar in structure to the later Monk's Tale and like that tale, and many of his other works, seems to be unfinished. Chaucer's sources for the legends include: Virgil's Aeneid, Vincent of Beauvais, Guido delle Colonne's Historia destructionis Troiae, Gaius Julius Hyginus' Fabulae and Ovid's Metamorphoses and Heroides.

The Legend of Cleopatra: Mark Anthony leaves his wife (the sister of Octavian) in search for another wife. He finds Cleopatra and falls in love with her. They get married and have a great feast but shortly after the feast Mark Anthony learns that Octavian is still angry and is sailing to meet him. Cleopatra and Mark Anthony sail out and meet Octavian. Mark Anthony is defeated in battle so to save his reputation he stabs himself. Cleopatra hears of the death of Mark Anthony and mourns his death extensively. She had sworn that whatever happened to him, would happen to her. So she filled a pit next to Mark Anthony's shrine with venomous snake and laid herself into a final rest next to him.

The Legend of Thisbe: Thisbe and Pyramus love each other dearly. However, they are not able to be together. They talked through the crack in the wall that separated their dwellings. They planned to meet at a tree later that evening. Thisbe arrives and sits under the tree waiting for Pyramus to show up. Suddenly a lion appears. The lion's mouth is covered in blood so Thisbe decides to flee. While fleeing, she drops the veil that she was wearing. Pyramus finally arrives at the tree and finds the veil. He assumes the worst and decides to stab himself with his sword. Thisbe soon returns to find her lover dead. She takes the same sword and kills herself.

The Legend of Dido: Aeneas is told by Venus that he is to seek out Dido and win her heart. When Aeneas is out hunting with Dido, it begins to storm. They run to seek shelter in a cave. They soon notice that they are alone in the cave. Aeneas confesses his love for Dido. At first, Dido refuses to confess that she loves Aeneas back. However, she finally admits to him that she loves him dearly. Aeneas begins to court Dido but eventually he loses interest in her. He starts to plan how he will leave her and not return. Dido learns that he is trying to leave and she attempts to stop him from going. Aeneas leaves despite Dido trying to stop him. Dido then calls upon her sister to prepare a funeral arrangement. When Dido sees the funeral arrangement she takes Aeneas’ sword and stabs herself.

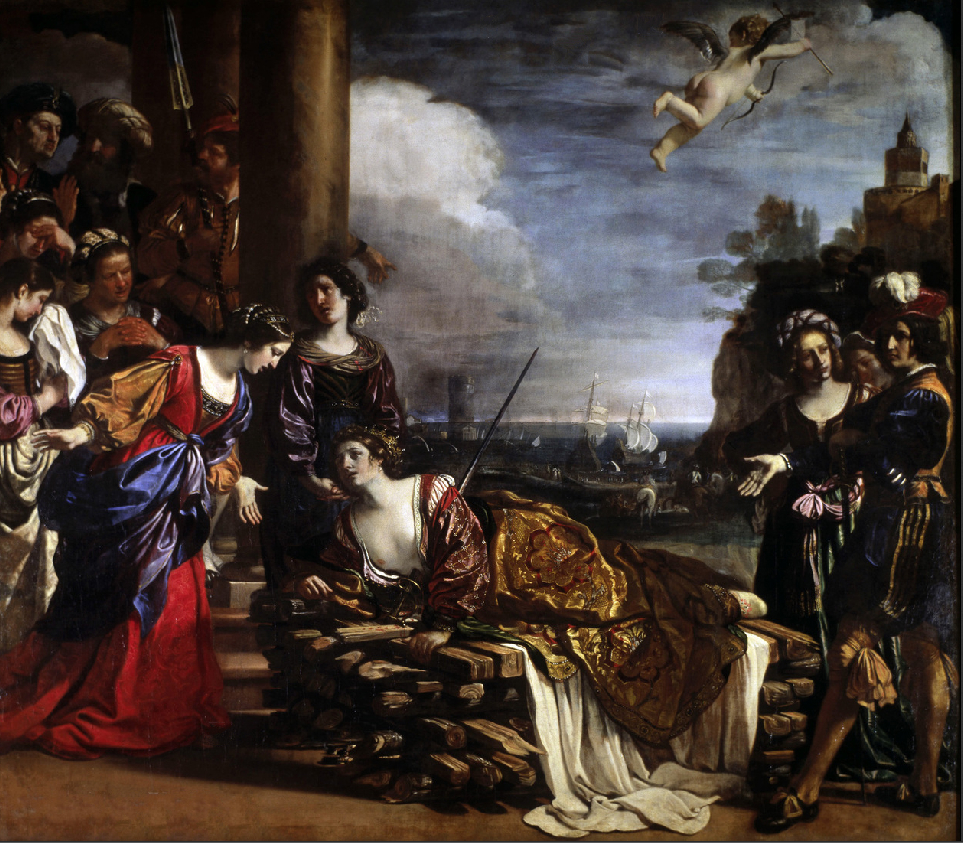
Death of Dido, by Guercino, AD 1631.

The Legend of Hypsipyle and Medea: The intro of this legend calls Jason out for the way he lies to the two women about how he would die for love. The intro also states how the unfaithful lover will receive more delight than the faithful one. The Legend of Hypsipyle at beginning tells the reader that Jason is the king's nephew and then continues on to say he was once honorable. King Pelias (Jason's uncle) became worried that Jason would be so well liked so he plotted to send him to his death. King Pelias told him that he wants him to go on a quest to find a treasure. He tells Jason that he will pick the men to go with him and pay for the expedition. Jason, being young and courageous, accepts. He is granted a crew (Hercules is part of his crew) and sails to the island where he meets Hypsipyle, who sent a man to ask is Jason required any help and he tells the messenger to thank the Queen, but they only want favorable winds. Jason meets the Queen at the beach and greets her. She examines him and notes that he must be of nobility. Jason stays at Hypsipyle's a while waiting on the good wind; during that time Jason woos her. Jason eventually marries Hypsipyle and has children with her. He takes all her property, sets sail and leaves her. She never sees him again. Hypsipyle decides to be faithful to her husband and dies alone and sad.

The legend of Medea starts with Jason arriving at Colchis, looking for a woman to satisfy his lust. Jason goes to the king and requests permission to find the Golden Fleece. The king grants his request and is so honored that he sits Jason next to his daughter, Medea. Medea has previously heard of Jason's reputation and starts to fall in love with him. She tells him she is worried about him attempting to find the Golden Fleece. He tells her that he is honored that she is worried about his safety. She explains to him all the dangerous things he would face. She tells him that she can help save him from some of these dangers, but, if she does, he will become her faithful husband. Jason succeeds and brings Medea across the sea to his homeland. However, Jason does the same thing to Medea that he did to Hypsipyle. He marries her, takes her treasures, has children with her and then abandons her.

The Legend of Lucretia: When Rome is under siege, Sextus Tarquinius goes to his friend Collatinus's house to see his wife, Lucretia, who is in her chambers with her hair down (as she is not expecting visitors). She explains how she hopes Collatinus is safe and at home soon. Collatinus shows himself and she begins to cry and kiss him. Sextus Tarquinius looks at Lucretia and begins to examine her features. He desires her so bad that he decides he will make Lucretia his. He sneaks into her room and forces himself upon her. He makes her be submissive by placing his sword at her heart and threatening to kill a stable boy and place him there. Lucretia doesn't want to soil her good name and so she submits to him. After the act, Lucretia calls her husband, ladies and parents. She explains the horrible act that has occurred. She explains that she doesn't deserve forgiveness; she then takes a knife and kills herself.

== Analysis ==
=== The Problem with Two Prologues ===
The story itself has two alternate prologues Chaucer authored for the story. The prevailing theory is that the contemporary criticism of the story following its release motivated Chaucer to sanitize or edit his prologue to be more fitting for the audience at hand. With Queen Anne in power, the topic of feminism was very much a hot button issue. Chaucer's motivation for authoring the work in the first place is understood as a penance of his previous and unflattering depictions of women in his society. This factor could have had a strong influence on Chaucer to edit his original take.

There is a shorter and a longer of the two, and nobody can definitively assess which is the original and which is the edited. The context of the story, and the subject matters relations to the other works of Chaucer tells us that it was most likely penned sometime in the midpoint of his career. The authorship of the story is not known to an exact date, but the existence of these two prologues has helped to determine the specific period in Chaucer's career that the story was likely written, it has a practical significance in decoding Chaucer's career. The lack of information surrounding the stories publication and mysterious origins has influenced critics over the years to debate not only which of the two is the original version but also which is the superior one for the story.

Contemporary English criticism and analysis of these two prologues has traditionally focused on the opening paragraphs of both versions, since the first half of both poems are largely identical. Some critics point to the stories purpose in its shared details between both versions of the prologue as the indicator of the story as a sort of “Ladies Handbook” based on the stories and characters admirable femininity. In the prologue itself, Chaucer states how its authorship was motivated by his previously ill portrayal of women in his other works. Other critics take this sentiment of penance as the real indicator as to which of the two works is the original as well as the superiorly honest. If this were true, then the original version of the prologue would most likely be the more brutally honest of the two, perhaps the longer less edited version. It has been argued that his continued unfavorable portrayal of his stories purpose in this prologue caused him to edit it down. So, it's largely subjective what the reader will take the story as with these two differing contexts. Was Chaucer simply trying to sanitize his public image or was he really admentally motivated in creating a companion text for women to utilize? And, if so, how did these sentiments motivate the editing process? These are the essential questions that drive the critical conversation.

The last essential detail of the debate between both prologues lies in the purpose of an analysis of the two, critically, or practically. Lowes argues that the only real purpose we can get out of both versions of the prologue is to help determine the specific details and supposed authorship of The Legend of Good Women or other Chaucerian tales, and that is rather useless to debate which version is superior since they are largely identical in the first place. Other critics like Goddard, are interested in the person of Chaucer or his individual character. Was he really as good willed as he comes off in his work or was he really just pandering to his critics? This rift in criticism and analysis has largely dominated the existing critical spheres and permeated nearly decades of debate surrounding the story. Alternatively, other scholars have attempted to scatologically categorize these arguments and debates into definitive references of the ongoing conversation itself. The most recent additions to the conversation more or less look like this, compendiums of the past critical analysis and prevailing hypothesis with a new theory presented at the conclusion.

=== Importance of Women to the Poem ===
Women play an important role in Chaucer's collection of legendary stories, The Legend of Good Women. Not only do women make up the majority of the characters in the poem, but it is also thought that women form a large part of the audience for this poem as well.

The most clear depiction of the importance of women to this piece would be the ten female characters: Cleopatra, Thisbe, Dido, Hypsipyle, Medea, Lucrece, Ariadne, Philomela, Phyllis and Hypermnestra. All of these female characters are taken from classical legends and mythology, which Chaucer decides to retell in his own poem. Nicola F. McDonald notes that throughout the narratives, Chaucer makes reference to his predominantly female audience and even questions them in the piece itself. These pagan mythological characters whose stories all include love and betrayal could serve as warnings and cautionary tales to the poem's female readers. McDonald also speculates that some of the text might serve as “motherly advice” to young women on how they should act and think properly during that time period which would also support the idea that this poem was meant for a female audience.

Because it was controversial during that time period to show individualism, especially for women, Chaucer's style of writing in The Legend of Good Women could be read as both conservative and radical depending on who was reading it. Although this series of poems seems to be about the legends of these women and their difficulties with love, it has a political undertone that points to the controversial topic of individualism. Helen Phillips writes that Chaucer uses a specifically “amorous” tone in these poems to veil this controversy, while adding in political jargon to these otherwise unpolitical stories to still suggest this underlying topic. Most likely the female audience would have read this story as a satire rather than as an informational story on how they should act, which is how the male audience would have read the poem. So, the women played an important role in interpreting this piece in the way that Chaucer intended.

== Bibliography ==
- Arner, Lynn. Chapters 4 and 5 of Chaucer, Gower, and the Vernacular Rising: Poetry and the Problem of the Populace after 1381. University Park: Penn State University Press, 2013.
- Chaucer, Geoffrey, The Riverside Chaucer, edited by Larry D. Benson et al., Houghton Mifflin Co., 1987, pp. 587–630.
- Delany, Sheila, The Naked Text: Chaucer's Legend of Good Women. Berkeley: University of California Press, 1994
- Dinshaw, Carolyn (1989). "'The naked text in English to declare': The Legend of Good Women". Chaucer's Sexual Poetics. Univ of Wisconsin Press. pp. 65–87. ISBN 978-0-299-12274-4.
- Gardner, John (1968). "The Two Prologues to the 'Legend of Good Women'". The Journal of English and Germanic Philology. 67 (4): 594–611. JSTOR 27705603.
- Goddard, H. C. (1908). "Chaucer's Legend of Good Women". The Journal of English and Germanic Philology. 7 (4): 87–129. JSTOR 27699943.
- Goddard, H. C. (1909). "Chaucer's Legend of Good Women (Continued)". The Journal of English and Germanic Philology. 8 (1): 47–111. JSTOR 27699951.
- Kiser, Lisa, Telling Classical Tales: Chaucer and the 'Legend of Good Women". Ithaca: Cornell University Press, 1983.
- McDonald, Nicola F. (2000). "Chaucer's Legend of Good Women, Ladies at Court and the Female Reader1". The Chaucer Review. 35 (1): 22–42. doi:10.1353/cr.2000.0020. JSTOR 25096115. Project MUSE 8465.
- Lowes, John Livingston (1909). "Is Chaucer's 'Legend of Good Women' a Travesty?". The Journal of English and Germanic Philology. 8 (4): 513–569. JSTOR 27699996.
- Percival, Florence, Chaucer's Legendary Good Women. Cambridge: Cambridge University Press, 1988.
- Phillips, Helen (2002). "Register, Politics, and the Legend of Good Women". The Chaucer Review. 37 (2): 101–128. doi:10.1353/cr.2002.0023. JSTOR 25096196. Project MUSE 37599.
