= Rudi Stern =

American multimedia artist

- Born: Rudolph George Stern; November 30, 1936; New Haven, Connecticut
- Died: August 15, 2006 (aged 69); Cadiz, Spain
- Known for: Multimedia artist
- Spouses: Moira North (m. 1980; div. 1988) Raffaella Trivi (m. 2004–2006)

Rudolph George Stern (November 30, 1936 – August 15, 2006) was an American multimedia artist most widely known for his work in neon. In his later years, he concentrated on making documentary films.

== Early life and education ==
Stern was born in New Haven, Connecticut. He graduated from Bard College in 1958 with a bachelor's degree in studio arts and from University of Iowa in 1960 with a master's degree. He also studied painting with Oskar Kokoschka and Hans Hofmann.

== Career ==
In the mid-1960s, he moved to New York City, where he met the poet and artist Jackie Cassen. They collaborated on multimedia installations of kinetic art, including the "Psychedelic Celebration Number One" for LSD advocate Timothy Leary, and installations at the Electric Circus nightclub. With video artist and documentarian John Reilly, Stern founded Global Village Video in 1969.

In 1972, he founded Let There Be Neon, a studio and gallery in New York. He designed and produced neon pieces for the Broadway show, Kiss of the Spider Woman, and other art and music performances, as well as commercial signs.

Together with Katharine Kean, he directed the 1992 documentary Haití: Killing the Dream, starring Jean-Bertrand Aristide.

Between 1999 and 2001, his multimedia installation "Theater of Light" was shown at multiple locations in New York and New Jersey. The installation involved several screens, more than 30 projectors and "surrounded audience members with densely layered, constantly changing images, intricately choreographed to music."

== Personal life ==
Stern was married twice, to Moira North and then to Raffaella Trivi. He had two daughters: Stella (with Trivi) and Lumiere (by an earlier relationship).

He died in 2006 at his home in Cadiz, Spain, from complications of lung cancer.

== Publications ==
- di Lemme, Philip (1984). American Streamline: Handbook of Neon Advertising Design. Introduction by Rudi Stern. Van Nostrand Reinhold Company. ISBN 978-0-442-28104-5.
- Stern, Rudi (1979). Let There Be Neon. Harry N Abrams. ISBN 978-0-8109-1255-7.
- Stern, Rudi (1990). Contemporary Neon. Visual Reference Publications Inc. ISBN 978-0-934590-37-2.

== See also ==
- Neon lighting
