= Bim Bom =

Russian clown duo

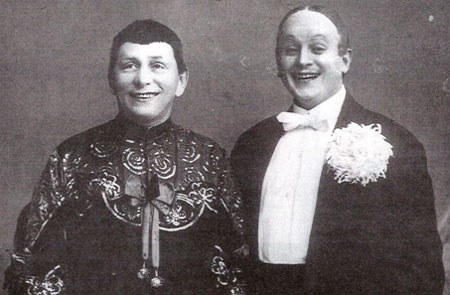
- Bim and Bom, 1910

Comedy career
- Years active: 1891- 1940s
- Medium: Clowning
- Genre: Circus

Bim Bom (or Bim and Bom) was a Moscow circus clown duo consisting of Ivan Radunsky (as Bim) and various "Boms", active intermittently from 1891 up until at least World War II. The clown act was enormously popular, but often banned or censored due to its satirical political content. Each act would begin with an original song and dance performed by Bim. The duo has been called "the most popular entertainment in Civil War Moscow".

Bim was always played by Radunsky, but Bom was played by several different individuals, among them Vitaly Lazarenko, Cortesi (a Russianized Italian), Stanevsky (a Pole), an accomplished musician Wilczak and Kamsky (a Russian).

After the October Revolution in 1917, the duo turned some of their wit against the new power. Yakov Peters in his memoirs mentions an episode when some Chekists saw them mocking the Soviets and tried to arrest them on the scene. The public at first thought that this was part of the sketch, until clowns ran as real shots were fired. Misha Melnichenko in his book Советский анекдот. Указатель сюжетов (2014) remarks that at these times quite a few political jokes were framed as a Bim and Bom dialogs, but this may be reasonably explained by the folkloric tradition to involve notable persons in the jokes, and there is no convincing evidence of Bim-Bom's authorship of these jokes, not to mention numerous copycat fake Bim-Boms trying to exploit the popularity of the duo.

In Andrew and Gordievsky's history of the KGB in 1990, Bim Bom is identified as an individual (not a pair), who had been shot at by Cheka operatives during a performance in Moscow in 1918.

Bim Bom is mentioned in the 2007 documentary, "Russian Revolution In Colour", but the reference in the film is inaccurate.
