= Dream of Fair to Middling Women =

1992 novel written by Samuel Beckett in 1932

- First edition 1992
- Author: Samuel Beckett
- Language: English
- Publisher: Black Cat
- Publication date: 1992 (written in 1932)
- Publication place: United States
- Media type: Print (Hardcover & Paperback)
- Pages: 241 pp
- ISBN: 978-0-948050-09-1
- OCLC: 27052646

Dream of Fair to Middling Women is Samuel Beckett’s first novel. Written in English "in a matter of weeks" in 1932 when Beckett was only 26 and living in Paris, the clearly autobiographical novel was rejected by publishers and shelved by the author. The novel was eventually published in 1992, three years after the author's death.

The title parodies Tennyson's "A Dream of Fair Women" and the term "fair to middling," applied to agricultural products.

== Partial publication ==
Fragments from the book were published during Beckett's lifetime: "Text" and "Sedendo et Quiescendo" were actually published before he started working on the book and subsequently became part of it, whilst "Jem Higgins' Love-Letter to the Alba" was published in 1965. Further excerpts were published in Disjecta, 1983.

Beckett refused to allow the entire novel to be published during his lifetime, on the grounds that it was "immature and unworthy": his biographer Deirdre Bair believes that his reluctance to make it available to the reading public was to avoid offending lifelong friends whom Beckett satirised in the book.

== Setting and influences ==
The novel is set in the town of Kassel, Germany, where 17-year-old Peggy Sinclair, a cousin of Beckett, lived with her parents. Beckett made several visits in Kassel 1928–32. The main character Belacqua, a writer and teacher, is very similar to Beckett himself, though a character named "Mr. Beckett" also makes an appearance in the book. Belacqua's name is taken from the character created by Dante. Influences on the novel include Geoffrey Chaucer's The Legend of Good Women, Alfred Tennyson's "A Dream of Fair Women" and Henry Williamson's The Dream of Fair Women.

== Themes ==
Two main themes can be found in the Dream: a rejection of realism in characters and the novel itself; and an anti-feminism, or perhaps an anti-sexuality, disavowing the possibility of sexual relations. The narrator explicitly criticises such realist figures as Balzac and Jane Austen, for their rigid characters and spurious novelistic coherence; but also challenges Proust’s exploitation of involuntary memory, and his metaphoric method of approach.

At the same time, the work is concerned with a sense of the body as a machine that is broken; and with male sexuality as oscillating between Apollo and Narcissus. “We give you one term of Apollo: chasing a bitch, the usual bitch. And one term of Narcissus: running away from one”.

Both themes come together in a rejection both of a realist world, and of a unified self to be found in sexual relations.

== See also ==
- More Pricks Than Kicks
- "Proust" (Beckett Essay)
