= Murphy (novel) =

Novel by Samuel Beckett

- 1957 Grove Press edition cover of Murphy
- Author: Samuel Beckett
- Language: English
- Genre: Novel
- Published: 1938
- Publisher: Routledge
- Publication place: United Kingdom

Murphy, first published in 1938, is an avant-garde novel, the third work of prose fiction by the Irish author and dramatist Samuel Beckett. The book was Beckett's second published prose work after the short-story collection More Pricks than Kicks (published in 1934) and his unpublished first novel Dream of Fair to Middling Women (published posthumously in 1992). It was written in English, rather than the French of much of Beckett's later writing. After many rejections, it was published by Routledge on the recommendation of Beckett's painter friend Jack Butler Yeats.

The University of Reading bought the six notebooks which made up the manuscript for Murphy in July 2013.

== Plot summary ==
The plot of Murphy follows an eponymous "seedy solipsist" who lives in a soon-to-be-condemned apartment in West Brompton. The novel opens with the protagonist having tied himself naked to a rocking chair in his apartment, rocking back and forth in the dark. This seems to be a habit for Murphy, who in carrying out the ritual attempts to enter a near-if-not-totally-nonexistent state of being (possibly something akin to sensory deprivation), which he finds pleasurable.

Murphy's "meditation" is juxtaposed with conversations he has with his friend and mentor Neary, an eccentric from Cork who has the ability to stop his heart—an ability or condition which Neary calls the "Apmonia" (a play on the Greek word for "harmony"), sometimes referred to as "Isonomy" or the "Attunement". The book states that this is a "mediation between... extremes" of heart attack and heart failure, allowing Neary to enter a state of survivable cardiac arrest at will. An early conversation between Neary and Murphy is spurred by some type of revelation Neary receives during one of these routine heart-stopping sessions, and the two are prompted to discuss their respective romantic lives. Murphy admits that "there is a Miss Counihan," though their relationship is unclear.

Murphy's "meditation" is further interrupted by a call from his current lover, Celia Kelly, who became a prostitute following the deaths of her parents at a young age. Murphy had proposed to Celia shortly after meeting her, but they have so far been unable to wed due to both their lack of money: "Celia spent every penny she earned and Murphy earned no pennies" and Murphy's conflicted feelings: "The part of him that he hated craved for Celia, the part that he loved shrivelled up at the thought of her." Celia finds Murphy in his flat still tied naked to the rocking chair, which he has somehow overturned. She rushes to assist him, noticing a large pink birthmark on his right buttock for the first time. She urges him to find a job, finally telling him that if he doesn't, she will leave him. Murphy reluctantly agrees to try.

Murphy begins work as a nurse at the Magdalen Mental Mercyseat in north London, finding the insanity of the patients an appealing alternative to conscious existence.

Murphy, gone to ground in London lodgings and then in the hospital, is pursued by a ragtag troupe of eccentrics from his own country, each with their own often-conflicting motivations. Neary, a practitioner of eastern mysticism, seeks Murphy as a love rival and then as compatible friend in the absence of all others. Miss Counihan's attachment to Murphy is romantic. Among Wylie's motivations, Miss Counihan is perhaps the strongest. And Cooper, Neary's simpleton servant and fixer, joins the trail for money, alcohol, and to serve his master.

== Analysis ==
Among other things, Murphy is an example of Beckett's fascination with the artistic and metaphorical possibilities of chess. Near the novel's end, Murphy plays a game of chess with Mr. Endon, a patient who is "the most biddable little gaga in the entire institution". But Murphy cannot replicate his opponent's symmetrical and cyclical play, just as he is unable to will himself into a state of catatonic bliss. He resigns "with fool's mate in his soul", and dies shortly afterwards. Beckett relates the game in full English notation, complete with a comically arch commentary.

Moving between Ireland and England, the novel is caustically satirical at the expense of the Irish Free State, which had recently banned Beckett's More Pricks Than Kicks: the astrologer consulted by Murphy is famous 'throughout civilised world and Irish Free State'; 'for an Irish girl' Murphy's admirer Miss Counihan was 'quite exceptionally anthropoid'; and in the General Post Office, site of the 1916 Rising, Neary assaults the buttocks of Oliver Sheppard's statue of mythic Irish hero Cúchulainn (the statue in fact possesses no buttocks).

Indeed, the censor is roundly mocked: Celia, a prostitute whose profession is described tactfully as "music" in a passage by the author, who writes that "this phrase is chosen with care, lest the filthy censors should lack an occasion to commit their filthy synecdoche." Later, when Miss Counihan is sitting on Wylie's knee, Beckett sardonically explains that this did not occur in Wynn's Hotel, the Dublin establishment where earlier dialogue took place. The novel also contains a scabrous portrait of poet Austin Clarke as the dipsomaniac Austin Ticklepenny, given to unreciprocated 'genustuprations' of Murphy under the table; against Oliver St. John Gogarty's advice, Clarke declined to sue.

Murphy indeed cannot go insane to achieve freedom. What he turns to instead is nothingness, and he leaves a letter to Celia requesting that his ashes be flushed down the toilet of the Abbey Theatre during a performance after immolating himself with gas in his bedroom at the hospital. Celia also discovers the beauty of nothingness, as she loses her love, Murphy, and her grandfather's health declines. Beckett seamlessly converts comedy to terror of non-existence, as he does in his later work, Waiting for Godot.

Among the many thinkers to influence Murphy's mind–body debate are Spinoza, Descartes, and the little-known Belgian occasionalist Arnold Geulincx.

== See also ==
- List of most expensive books and manuscripts
