= More Pricks Than Kicks =

Short prose collection by Samuel Beckett

- First edition (publ. Chatto & Windus)
- Author: Samuel Beckett
- Language: English
- Publication date: 1934

More Pricks Than Kicks is a collection of short prose by Samuel Beckett, first published in 1934. It contains extracts from his earlier novel, Dream of Fair to Middling Women (for which he was unable to find a publisher), as well as other short stories.

The stories chart the life of the book's main character, Belacqua Shuah, from his days as a student to his accidental death. Beckett takes the name Belacqua from a figure in Dante's Purgatorio, a Florentine lute-maker famed for his laziness, who has given up on ever reaching heaven. The opening story, "Dante and the Lobster," features Belacqua's horrified reaction to the discovery that the lobster he has bought for dinner must be boiled alive. "It's a quick death, God help us all," Belacqua tells himself, before the narrator's stern interjection to the contrary: "It is not."

"The Smeraldina's Billet Doux" is a love letter to Belacqua in fractured English by the German-speaking Smeraldina Rima, a character based on Beckett's cousin Peggy Sinclair. Other real-life originals of More Pricks Than Kicks characters include Mary Manning Howe (the Caleken Frica), Ethna MacCarthy (the Alba), and Lucia Joyce (the Syra Cusa).

Belacqua shows a marked enthusiasm for the state of matrimony, marrying in quick succession Lucy, Thelma bboggs, and the Smeraldina Rima.

The final story, "Draff," centres on his funeral.

At the suggestion of his Chatto editor, Charles Prentice, Beckett added another story, '"Echo's Bones," to the manuscript. In it, Belacqua returns from the dead. Prentice rejected the story, and it remained unpublished until 2014 (Faber & Faber and Grove Press).
