= Rough for Radio I =

1961 play by Samuel Beckett

Rough for Radio I is a short radio play by Samuel Beckett, written in French in 1961 and first published in Minuit 5 in September 1973 as Esquisse radiophonique. Its first English publication as Sketch for Radio Play was in Stereo Headphones 7 (spring 1976), and first appeared under its current title in Ends and Odds (Grove 1976, Faber 1977).

"Plans for a BBC production, with Humphrey Searle providing the music, were made soon after the publication of the original French version but came to nothing and a later BBC proposal to produce the play without music was rejected by Beckett in the late 1970s. According to the Beckett estate the French version was produced by ORTF (Office de Radiodiffusion Télévision Française) in 1962, although Beckett himself seems later to have forgotten about this production."

A complete run of all Beckett's radio plays was presented by RTÉ Radio 1 in 2006 to celebrate the centenary of the author's birth; Rough for Radio I was broadcast on April 12.

The work has also been produced on compact disc by the British pianist John Tilbury who also speaks the part of "He". It was recorded at Trinity College of Music and Electronic Music Studio, Goldsmiths College, London, in 2004/5 along with a version of Cascando, the music composed and performed by John Tilbury with electronic modulations by Sebastian Lexer.

== Synopsis ==
An unnamed woman visits a gloomy man, who we learn is called Macgillycuddy. She is under the impression that she is there on his invitation; he says not but nevertheless allows her entry. He is civil, formal, his conversation phatic. He effects a faux-subservience with his continual use of "Madam", but takes no steps to make her stay comfortable, refusing to provide even "a little heat" or "a little light" but he doesn't go so far as to forbid her squatting on the thick cushion she sees.

In the words of scholar Verna Brown, "[W]e experience a practised talker at work in the female well-wisher, with her reliable memory and inventory of conversational 'gambits' at the ready. Despite her skill, she is stymied in her efforts to advance the conversation by the male protagonist's uncooperative obduracy. He refuses to accommodate her desire to establish a probing 'frame', to elicit the information that her curiosity craves." Even when she expresses concern for how troubled he seems to her the man refuses, as Vladimir would put it, to "return the ball." He is a model of polite restraint, but why?

She has come, she informs him, to listen but then asks if she can "see them". He says not but he does permit her to operate the two knobs that control the music and the words she has come to hear. "[I]s it live?" she wants to know. He doesn't answer other than to instruct her how to control the sounds: "[You] must twist … To the right." His subsequent answers indicate there are individuals behind the sounds, one producing words, the other music. Each is alone, isolated from the other and required to produce their respective sound continually without respite. The man says he can't however describe their conditions for her. Both sounds are faint and "not together". The woman wants them louder but the volume never varies while she is there.

Having heard as much as she needs she wants to know if Macgillycuddy likes what he hears. For once he opens up and confesses that "[i]t has become a need" but admits nothing more. She readies to go, leaving him to his "needs" (a rather sardonic remark which he fails to counter). Before she exits, she asks a strange question: "Is that a Turkoman?" Predictably the man ignores the question and goes to show her out. She takes a wrong turn and nearly walks into where they keep the "house garbage" implying that there are other locations that produce waste.

After she has left there is a long pause. The audience then hears the sound of two curtains being drawn evocative of those around a hospital bed.

The man picks up the telephone receiver and dials. We only hear his side of the following phone conversations. He asks the young lady who answers the phone – he refers to her as "Miss" – to have the doctor call him back. He says that it's urgent and waits impatiently for the phone to ring.

It is hard to believe this is the same man who was so proper with his woman visitor only a few lines earlier. Could this be a different point in time completely? Or were the curtains available all the time but were only closed while he attended to his unwelcome visitor?

He gets a return call but it's only to inform him that they cannot locate the doctor. She rings off and he curses her: "Slut!" His agitation builds. He's beginning to panic.

The phone rings a second time. This time it may be the doctor who asks a number of pertinent questions to which the answers are, "they’re ending", "this morning", "she’s left me", "they’re together" and "how could they meet?" The voice on the end of the phone tries to reassure him that "last … gasps" are all alike and then rings off telling him he'll receive a visit in an hour. Macgillycuddy slams the phone down and curses again. This time he uses the word "Swine!" suggestive of the fact that he has been talking to a different person, most likely a male.

A few moments later the phone rings one final time. He's now told not to expect the doctor before noon the next day; he has two births (first gasps?) to attend to, one of which is breech.

Music and Voice are then heard "[t]ogether, ending, breaking off together, resuming together more and more feebly" and then there is nothing.

After a long pause the man whispers, "Tomorrow … noon …"

== Interpretation ==
Critics tend to avoid or at best gloss over this short piece.

"Beckett's play is a sort of quartet, a dialogue between a man, 'he', and a woman, 'she', interspersed by 'Music' and 'Voice'. 'Music' and 'Voice' are, we are led to believe, going on all the time; 'he' has two buttons, which allow him to listen in to them. Within the Beckett canon Rough for Radio I is usually thought of as a preliminary exploration of the possibilities of radio, which would be explored more fully in Cascando and Words and Music.” Barry McGovern confirms that Beckett requested that "[t]he first Rough for Radio [was] not for production, the author feeling that Cascando had overtaken it, so to speak."

In Rough for Radio I, the voice and the music are switched on and off as if they are being broadcast simultaneously on two separate radio stations. The same idea is presented in Cascando, but there the voice and the music do not seem to derive from an external source. Very much as the sound of the sea is in Embers, in Radio I, as it is sometimes called, "[m]usic is not, as usual, merely functional (for instance, as intermezzo, background music or even worse, quite simply a creator of atmosphere), but […] is allotted an intrinsic role."

But it is not simply a matter of turning a radio on and off. Voice and Music are characters in their own right. They occupy identical physical locations and conditions away from the "elicitor", as Merle Tönnies refers to him, and are apparently unaware of each other's existence. Macgillycuddy acts as a master figure [who] "extorts words or sounds from his servants or victims, over whom he appears to have absolute control."

Only he doesn't. Like the living statue in Catastrophe Voice and Music are capable of rebellion, even if that rebellion is simply to die and thus upset the status quo. As the play moves on it becomes clear that they are slipping out of his control. In many ways it is "obvious that the master is as dependent on his servants as they are on him."

Rather than the doctor being needed to attend to the ailing Voice and Music, Barry McGovern has put forward the thought that it is the man himself who is seeking medical attention and draws a parallel with the Bolton and Holloway story in Embers.

It has also been suggested that the knobs access a kind of sonar, which could allow the visitor to monitor the two babies that are waiting to be born. There could be a personal connection too. He says everyone has left him. This might include a pregnant wife. The fact that Voice and Music occupy two identical spaces could represent wombs but there is too little to work with here to be sure.

== Works inspired by ==
Radio I is a realisation of Rough for Radio I, which the Dutch composer Richard Rijnvos made for Nederlandse Omroep Stichting (NOS) in 1991. Michael Gough played 'He' and Joan Plowright, 'She'. The composer John Cage was the voice with music by the Ives Ensemble.

In Raymond Gervais's 2006 work Je suis venue pour écouter (I Have Come to Listen), extracts from Esquisse radiophonique as well as from his own translation of Rough for Radio II appear on the cover of CD cases grouped together on the wall. Displayed in total darkness, the installation can only be discovered partially, with the use of a flashlight.
