= Quad (play) =

1981 play by Samuel Beckett

Quad is a television play by Samuel Beckett, written and first produced and broadcast in 1981. It first appeared in print in 1984 (Faber and Faber) where the work is described as "[a] piece for four players, light and percussion" and has also been called a "ballet for four people."

It consists of four actors dressed in robes, hunched and silently walking around and diagonally across a square stage in fixed patterns, alternately entering and exiting. Each actor wears a distinct colored robe (white, red, blue, yellow), and is accompanied by a distinct percussion instrument (leitmotif). The actors walk in sync (except when entering or exiting), always on one of four rotationally symmetric paths (e.g., when one actor is at a corner, so are all others; when one actor crosses the stage, all do so together, etc.), and never touch – when walking around the stage, they move in the same direction, while when crossing the stage diagonally, where they would touch in the middle, they avoid the center area (walking around it, always clockwise or always anti-clockwise, depending on the production). In the original production, the play was first performed once, and then, after a pause, an abbreviated version was performed a second time, this time in black and white and without musical accompaniment. These are distinguished as Quad I and Quad II, though Quad II does not appear in print.

== Broadcast history ==
The play was first broadcast by the Süddeutscher Rundfunk in Germany on 8 October 1981, as Quadrat I + II. Beckett himself directed ("assisted by Bruno Voges"). The four performers, all "members of the Stuttgart Preparatory Ballet School", were, Helfried Foron, Juerg Hummel, Claudia Knupfer and Susanne Rehe. The same performance was rebroadcast on 16 December 1982, by BBC Two.

== Background ==
As far back as 1963 Beckett had thought of creating a geometrical mime. He tried to write a piece for Jack MacGowran (generally referred to as J. M. Mime) but abandoned it "in the absence of all inner need."

"Beckett’s initial conception … was to have [a pair] of characters walking along Quadrants in all possible paths starting from O (a central origin) and returning to O. But in its final realization almost twenty years later, the mime begins and ends with the void, an empty quad, and travellers deflect their steps away from O."

The discarded work was "intended as a mime for two players (son and father or mother) who are described as naked under their coats. The stage is plotted out in a square, the four corners of which (lettered A-D) are to be marked either by two boots and two hats or by four boots, recalling the boots and hat found onstage in Godot;" the midpoints were lettered E-G, and the centre, O.

The idea goes back even further however, "indeed Quad may be regarded as the fulfillment onstage of the goal he had set himself in 1937 in the letter to Axel Kaun, the achieving of an entirely new means of expression through the elimination of language."

== Synopsis ==
=== Quad I ===
"Quad is based on a geometrical figure and on permutations of regular movements. First one, then two, then three, then four figures, dancers or mime artistes, dressed in coloured djellabas (white, yellow, blue and red) appear one after another to scurry along the sides and across the diagonals of a square, shuffling in strict rhythm to a rapid percussion beat. Each figure then departs in the order in which he appeared, leaving another to recommence the sequence … Strikingly all of them avoid the centre which is clearly visible in the middle of the square."

Movements and Stages
Stage	Series 1				Series 2				Series 3				Series 4
One	white	-	-	-	yellow	-	-	-	blue	-	-	-	red	-	-	-
Two	white	blue	-	-	yellow	white	-	-	blue	yellow	-	-	red	blue	-	-
Three	white	blue	red	-	yellow	white	red	-	blue	yellow	white	-	red	blue	yellow	-
Four	white	blue	red	yellow	yellow	white	red	blue	blue	yellow	white	red	red	blue	yellow	white
Five	-	blue	red	yellow	-	white	red	blue	-	yellow	white	red	-	blue	yellow	white
Six	-	-	red	yellow	-	-	red	blue	-	-	white	red	-	-	yellow	white

Courses
Course 1	AC	CB	BA	AD	DB	BC	CD	DA
Course 2	BA	AD	DB	BC	CD	DA	AC	CB
Course 3	CD	DA	AC	CB	BA	AD	DB	BC
Course 4	DB	BC	CD	DA	AC	CB	BA	AD

The four series of six stages each produce a total of twenty-four stages suggesting, as in Lessness, the measurement of time.

According to the script each character was to be unique in a number of ways. Apart from the colour of the outfit, they were to be "[a]s alike in build as possible. Short and slight for preference … Adolescents a possibility. Sex indifferent." That said, each player's footsteps were to be distinctive, each was to be accompanied by their own musical instrument and illuminated by a light, the same colour as their outfit. For technical reasons, in the original broadcast, white light was used. To help the performers cope with the rhythmic chaos "[t]hey wore headphones under their hoods, so they could hear the percussion beats."

There is an element of chance in this piece in that Beckett does not indicate how the footsteps should differ nor which instruments should be used other than they should be percussive ("say drum, gong, triangle, wood block"). He also doesn't specify a required sequence for the colors.

The play is shown as recorded, with no cuts, just one fixed long take. Beckett had originally calculated its length at 25 minutes but, in reality, the whole set was completed in nine-and-a-half minutes.

=== Quad II ===
During the end of the taping, Beckett saw the color production of Quad rebroadcast on a black and white monitor, and decided instantly to create a second part of the play, to be called Quad II. While watching technicians test the image quality for reception by monochrome receivers, Beckett was struck by the look of the tape slowed down and in black and white. He suddenly exclaimed: 'My God, it's a hundred thousand years later!' Seeing the hectic bustle of the performance he had already recorded transformed into the slow, dim shuffle, made Beckett imagine a future time where his walkers continue their performance.

"The fast percussion beats were … removed and the only sounds that were heard were the slower, shuffling steps of the weary figures and, almost inaudibly, the tick of a metronome." The performers now wore identical robes and moved at half the pace. The new section, called Quad II, lasts four minutes as it only allows for one series of movements, compared to the four in Quad I.

"The second version was a masterstroke, a second act to dramatize the entropy of the motion. And, since the figures always turn left, not only at the centre but at all the corners also, the pattern is that of the damned in the Inferno. Quad is indeed a sinister piece."

The director Alan Schneider wrote to Beckett (13 November 1981) after viewing the television program several times: "much moved, especially by the slower section. Want to work on that as a stage piece with some of my students here – no audience – would you mind?" Beckett replied (20 November 1981): "Can’t see Quad on stage. But by all means have a go." Later (6 February 1982) he made a qualifying remark: "Quad can’t work on stage. But no doubt interesting for students, gymnastically." These are fascinating remarks considering the fact that Beckett takes no real advantage of the many televisual techniques available, no close-ups, freeze frames, pans, cuts, zooms, slow-motion shots or split screens – simply a fixed camera "far South of the circle, overlooking it" that might represent any member of a theatre-going audience.

[As with Film] Beckett's printed text was never revised to acknowledge this revision of the work's fundamental structure. No printed version of the play bears the title of the production, and so no version that includes Beckett's revisions with Quad II exists in print. Beckett's own videotaped German production, remains the only 'text' that recognizes Quad as a two part work."

== Interpretation ==
"Modern works of art often call for prolonged continuous close attention if one is to appreciate them. The same is true of a gator basking in the sun on a mud bank in a swamp. Anything viewed makes demands."

The building blocks of Quad can be found in a number of Beckett's other works:

"In Play, there is a correlation between light and voice, and a da capo structure that forms an image of hell, but the voices of W1, W2 and M (an eternal triangle) do not follow a predictable sequence. In this respect, action and dialogue differs from that of Come and Go, where it is shaped by the mathematical sequence, a series of ritual movements: as one character leaves, another moves up into the vacant centre." Both Come and Go and Quad trace shapes through highly patterned movements and interaction that mimic life through extreme abstraction. These works are the inner rhythms laid bare." "Geometrical structures of light and darkness shape the stage settings of Ghost Trio, and ...but the clouds...; while in Breath and Not I the light is arithmetical, changing in time. Quad integrates both forms: the quad is set out geometrically, but the movements of the players defined arithmetically, with absolute precision. Behind the dramaticule is a metaphor of coincidence, or meeting in time and space, and hence the 'danger zone' where this might happen." Even "the "perpetual separation and reunion of Vladimir and Estragon" which has been described as "a choreography of the void, a search for stepping-stones to best approach or avoid the other", can be seen to anticipate Quad, as can the fact that Act II covers the same ground as Act I in the same way that Quad II literally covers the same ground as Quad I.

Why are these four pacing so? Martin Esslin believes they "are clearly engaged in a quest for an Other." He reads "the centre that the hooded wanderers have so fearfully to avoid is obviously the point at which real communication, a real 'encounter,’ would be potentially possible but inevitably proves – by the very nature of existence itself – impossible.

Sidney Homan describes Quad’s world as a "faceless, emotionless one of the far future, a world where people are born, go through prescribed movements, fear non-being (E) even though their lives are meaningless, and then they disappear or die." This raises a philosophical question, one the writer Albert Camus tried to answer in his essay, The Myth of Sisyphus: Face to face with the meaninglessness of existence, what keeps us from suicide? What stops any of the four players from simply hurling themselves into the "danger zone"? To a large extent, Camus suggests that our instinct for life is much stronger than our reasons for suicide: "We get into the habit of living before acquiring the habit of thinking." We instinctively avoid facing the full consequences of the meaningless nature of life, through what Camus calls an "act of eluding."

The following section from Camus's essay could almost sum up both Quad I and Quad II:

[Quad I] "It happens that the stage-sets collapse. Rising, streetcar, four hours of work, meal, sleep, and Monday Tuesday Wednesday Thursday Friday and Saturday according to the same rhythm-this path is easily followed most of the time.
[Quad II] But one day the 'why' arises and everything begins in that weariness tinged with amazement. ...Weariness comes at the end of the acts of a mechanical life, but at the same time it inaugurates the impulse of consciousness … What follows is the gradual return into the chain or it is the definitive awakening."

The 'danger zone' may not, of course, signify death but it would take an act of faith – or "an act of lucidity" – to find out for sure. When Sidney Homan was rehearsing his version of Quad, to learn more about the piece the players improvised, what one of the actors called "a real ending, something more than the final character’s just disappearing" where the last character about the leave the stage, halts, turns, removes her hood and then, as if being beckoned by the centre, hesitantly makes her way there where the lights fade down on her.

If recourse to Beckett's own attitude is necessary, it is well documented that Beckett favoured the mere physicality of his work over interpretative readings. With Not I he stated explicitly that he was not "unduly concerned with intelligibility. [He wanted] "the piece to work on the nerves of the audience, not its intellect." With Quad, there are no longer any 'nasty words' for that to be an issue. During filming Beckett "spoke to the SDR cameraman, Jim Lewis about the difficulty that he now had in writing down any words without having the intense feeling that they would inevitably be lies."

Rather than trying to make 'sense' of Quad, it is perhaps better to consider the 'sensation' caused by Quad. It presents us with the 'meaning' behind the words. The problem with meanings is that we’re used to having them wrapped up IN words. They are like masks behind expressionless masks. Quad exposes the mechanism underneath the actors' actions; the clock's face and hands have been removed and all we are left with are the exposed workings, which can be a thing of beauty in its own right, and, of course, makes perfect sense in itself.

"As Susan D. Brienza indicates, in … Quad the four characters rhythmically draw mandala pictures that reveal concentric circles and include four quadrants. The dancers' counter-clockwise pacing evokes Jung's patient's leftward movement, which is equivalent to a progress towards the unconscious. They desperately attempt to achieve 'centering' and reinstate order and peace, to abolish the separation between the unconscious and the conscious mind."

"The avoidance of the centre is clearly a metaphor capable of wide interpretation, as with Winnie’s mound in Happy Days. The small empty square … could suggest the flight from self, the 'I' Beckett's characters so carefully avoid ... The deliberate avoidance of contact with each other, though present in the same square of light, is also a familiar theme in Beckett, whose characters frequently choose isolation as with Krapp or the Listener in That Time."

French philosopher Gilles Deleuze, renowned for his analyses of Beckett's works described Quad as a geometrically advanced work in one of his final essays, "The Exhausted" (1995):

Quad, lacking words, lacking voice, is a quadrilateral, a square. While it is perfectly determined, possessing certain dimensions, it has no other determinations than its formal singularities, equidistant vertices and center, no other contents or occupants than the four similar protagonists who traverse it ceaselessly. It is a closed, globally defined, any-space-whatever. Even the protagonists, who are short, slight, and asexual, and wear long gowns with cowls, have nothing to individualize them but the fact that each departs from a vertex as from a cardinal point, any-protagonists-whatever who traverse the square, each following a given course and direction.

Eckart Voigts-Virchow presents an interesting – and amusing – comparison between Beckett's play and the 1990s BBC children's TV show Teletubbies:

"Whereas the Teletubbies have presumably only just started to acquire the apparatus of human articulation ("Eh-oh!") and are trapped in their progress for hundreds of episodes by the requirements of serialization, Beckett’s hooded figures totally relinquish expressiveness beyond their coloured gowns, leitmotiv percussion, and racecourse. They are defined by mere physical exertion. The Quad figures are probably an image of how the Teletubbies will behave when they are close to death and their belly monitors have long gone blank and become sightless windows."

"That there is a pun in 'quad' and 'quod' (slang for gaol) can hardly have escaped Beckett. Since one of his Paris apartments overlooked the Santé Prison, he must have been conscious of the rhythm of life as lived in a prison over a long period. With this in mind the players following their prescribed course of movements around a square could be seen as 'doing time' in the most literal sense of the term and exercising within the precise limits of the prison yard."

== Musical interpretation ==
Pascal Dusapin, a contemporary French composer, invokes Beckett throughout his oeuvre. His concertante work for violin and ensemble, Quad, explicitly pays homage to Gilles Deleuze's description of Quad in "The Exhausted", and begins with the "exhaustion of possibilities", a theme reminiscent of many of the writer's propositions.

== Stagings ==
While Quad was originally a TV play, it has been performed on stage on occasion, first in 1986, by the Noho Theater Group (directed by Jonah Salz and choreographed by Susan Matthews).

In 2006, ANALOG arts received permission from the Beckett estate to stage Quad in a program of his short plays. Included in the ARTSaha! new music festival, Quad was programmed because of its strong affinity with the music of contemporary composers like John Cage and Karlheinz Stockhausen.

== See also ==
- Beckett–Gray code
