= ... but the clouds ... =

Television play by Samuel Beckett

... but the clouds ... is a television play by Samuel Beckett. Beckett wrote it between October–November 1976 "to replace a film of Play which the BBC had sent [him] for approval (and which he had rejected)" due to "the poor quality of the film". Donald McWhinnie directed Billie Whitelaw and Ronald Pickup. It was first broadcast on 17 April 1977 as part of a programme of three Beckett plays entitled 'Shades' on BBC2. It was first published in Ends and Odds (Faber) 1977. An early title for the piece was Poetry only love.

== Synopsis ==
The play opens in darkness and gradually reveals M, a "man sitting bowed over an invisible table". He is dressed in a gown and nightcap, and this is the only way he appears in the present throughout the play. The camera revisits this image fifteen times.

As the play unfolds, we hear a voice that we assume belongs to M, as it reflects his thoughts. He recalls past encounters with a woman and simultaneously visualizes his remembered or imagined self, referred to as M1, acting out the described motions within the circle of light. M contemplates what triggers the woman's appearance. At first he says, "When I thought of her..." but later realizes that she simply manifests to him, always at night. He reflects on his routine, starting with his return home after walking the roads since daybreak. He changes into night attire, enters his sanctum, attempts to summon the woman without success, and at dawn, he dresses once again and sets out on the road.

In summary, the play begins with M in darkness, seen in a recurring pose at his invisible table. We hear M's thoughts as he reminisces about encountering the woman, while M1 acts out these recollections in the circle of light. M reflects on the cause of her appearance, his routine, and his continuous cycle of summoning her at night and leaving at dawn.

The voice lists the three instances listed above where the woman has appeared to him in the past. When he reaches the third one the camera cuts to the woman's face, "reduced as far as possible to eyes and a mouth", which mouths silently along with the voice, "...clouds...but the clouds...of the sky..." The man then realises there is a fourth case, but not really a fourth per se because so much of the time, and in fact, the majority of the time when nothing happens, the woman never makes an appearance at all.

Despite the impression created by the opening scene, it is not the case that he spends every night solely focused on summoning the woman to appear. There are instances when he becomes weary and engages in other activities that he finds "more ... rewarding, such as ... cube roots" or sits absorbed with nothing – which he describes as a mine – like the man in Film.

We see M1 prepare for the road again and leave. The voice says, "Right," then the woman's face appears once more and the voice repeats the final four lines of Yeats's poem. This time, however, the woman does not mouth the words. Her face dissolves, we are left with the man sitting at his invisible table where we began and all fades to black.

== Title ==
The title comes from a phrase from the last verse of W. B. Yeats's near-solipsist poem, The Tower:

Now shall I make my soul,
Compelling it to study
In a learned school
Till the wreck of body,
Slow decay of blood,
Testy delirium
Or dull decrepitude,
Or what worse evil come -
The death of friends, or death
Of every brilliant eye
That made a catch in the breath -
Seem but the clouds of the sky
When the horizon fades;
Or a bird's sleepy cry
Among the deepening shades.

Several months after the McWhinnie production in which he was himself heavily involved, Beckett had the opportunity to act as his own director in the German version, Nur noch Gewölk, for Süddeutscher Rundfunk. In this production he made one or two minor changes but the main one was to include the whole last stanza above rather than the four lines in the original.

"The Tower is a work which discusses history and the past not only in terms of recollection but also as an entire complex of traces, remainders and legacies of which individual subjective memory is only one element."

"The painful, highly personal question raised by Yeats is: if the poet's physical powers fail, if his vision and hearing are impaired, can the memory of the sensory world serve as a basis for poetry? Is memory alone capable of stimulating the creative act? ... As he draws upon his memory, revisiting scenes both in his life and works, he comes to respond affirmatively to the pessimistic question first raised ... The poet's physical impairments, paradoxically, prove a blessing. Indeed, in the stanza from which Beckett derived his title, Yeats puts the real world in perspective, thereby reducing his own sense of loss." In a personal communication Beckett told Eoin O'Brien that this was one of Yeats's greatest lines.

But why this particular line from the poem? Is it to do with the nature of clouds? "Clouds seem permanent but are ultimately impermanent; they cannot be touched, yet can be seen; they are nothing more than condensed water, yet remain a symbol of romance, of the imagination beyond practical measurement – they are, in a phrase, at once here and elsewhere."

== Structure ==
=== Characters ===
The director, Sidney Homan, defines the four 'characters' in this work:

- M is the poet in reflective mode
- M1 is the poet in his active mode in the world
- W is his muse or the principle of poetry as it mediates between the material and the imaginative worlds
- V is the poet's voice that comes from M or accompanies the movements of M1 and that searches for the heightened language prerequisite for poetry

=== Stages ===
Unlike Quad, which utilises a single fixed camera throughout, there are a total of sixty camera shots in this piece, "the shape of an hour or a minute", which can be organised into four groups or stages. There are only two televisual techniques used throughout the play: fade and dissolve.

==== Stage 1 ====
(Directions 1-19): The first stage focuses on the past, those times when the woman did appear and M could be creative as a consequence.

==== Stage 2 ====
(Directions 20-26): The second stage examines where the poet is presently. There are three areas, just offstage in the darkness.

- West is the outside world in which he spends his days wandering.
- East is his closet where he exchanges his greatcoat for his robe.
- North, to the rear of the stage, is his sanctum in which, under the right conditions, he can be creative.

==== Stage 3 ====
(Directions 27-52): In the third stage the poet lists four possibilities:

- The woman can appear and then vanish immediately.
- The woman can appear and linger.
- The woman can appear and 'speak' to him, i.e. inspire him. He uses the example where she mouths the words, "but the clouds", and then vanishes.
- The woman can fail to appear at all, the most common scenario.

==== Stage 4 ====
(Direction 53-60): In the final stage, the poet actually "finds success, almost as an ironic consequence of his despair. The woman appears and, this time, V is able to [recite] all four lines from Yeats's poem, rather than the truncated and hence frustrating single line of the television play's title."

== Interpretation ==
In a number of other works Beckett has felt the need to split an individual into separate aspects of that character, e.g. Words and Music, where the writer, his words and his emotions are all represented by separate characters. "In ... but the clouds ..., however, Beckett is concerned not with fragments of the self, but the whole person. The protagonist, M, sees himself whole, (as at the end of Film) held in the light circle of the imagination ... The action of ... but the clouds ... consists of M reliving past experience with such intensity that he can see himself performing his daily routine."

The man is a poet, "caught in the writer's trap, the expectation of inspiration." The woman seems to be his muse. It may be Beckett is personifying her as a woman only in the abstract sense but it is just as likely, considering Beckett's most famous writer-character, Krapp, that she is also a lost love, a once-literal muse. Krapp's imagination is impotent though. M has not reached that stage. He is still having occasional flashes of inspiration. And this must have been very much how the seventy-year-old Beckett felt himself; writing was becoming increasing difficult for him. Either way, "although not quite a character, she is ... both an object of desire and a force beyond desire."

Krapp sat at a real table and heard a real voice, albeit himself as a younger man. The man in ... but the clouds ... sits at an invisible table unable to write. Everything he encounters is outside a circle of dim, suffused light. This gives the play a dreamlike quality; the circle of light becomes a kind of 'no place' where this daily ritual takes place. The only voice is the one inside his head. Even the roads take on an abstract quality; they are neither to nor from anywhere unlike the travel options in Cascando, for example.

Not all of Krapp's actions take place at his table, we hear him pouring drinks and attempting to sing in the darkness surrounding his stage as a means of distracting himself from the task in hand; in Quad, the players' only reality is within the lighted square as is the case with the women of Come and Go but in ... but the clouds ... all the real action takes place in the darkness, the central circle of light is a place of transition only.

The fact that the woman may well have been real, rather than some stereotypical projection of M's ideal woman, is suggested by the line, "With those unseeing eyes I so begged when alive to look at me." The camera focuses on the woman's face while these lines are spoken. Enoch Brater argues that "what he longs for is not the beloved but the image of his beloved, the evocative metaphor he has made of her. His is an exquisite despair. In his secret ceremony Beckett's male figure all but revels in it." Because the old man realises he cannot physically recall his beloved, he makes do with simulation; he torments himself with memories of what it was like when she came before. M is not only trying to remember, he is trying "to remember the way in which he used to remember".

"For Beckett and for Yeats, there is a difference between remembering and not remembering, but both writers remind us that not remembering does not necessarily equal forgetting. That which is not consciously 'remembered' by an individual can still return to impose itself is a variety of ways, one of which both Yeats and Beckett qualify as a kind of haunting." This makes one viewer's comment as to the nature of W all the more interesting when they call her "the character who appears but isn't really there – she only gives the appearance of an appearance."

The man is a poet but he is also – and unexpectedly – a mathematician, a rational man. Numbers play a significant part in Beckett's works (particularly the number three as it was a favourite of Dante's). "M's addiction to numbers – the four cases, the reference to cube roots, the two statistical possibilities given for the fourth case – [can be] explained as a defensive posture. M must know that the woman's appearance is at random and defies logic. His careful efforts to establish mathematically the exact and proper conditions for her appearance are merely an attempt to give order to an experience he knows, deep inside, is beyond rational measurement or prediction."

He would prefer that the woman appears when he thinks of her, that there should exist a clear correlation between conscious thought and realisation but his is not the case. He is forced to modify the theory he is testing acknowledging that the woman's face merely "appeared" and those appearances were always at night. By the end of the play "he has done all he can do, he is now at the mercy of Providence. The woman will appear if, pleased with his efforts, she decides to appear." There is an element of ritual to the piece, another common element of Beckett's theatre. Perhaps it is the only way he can feel he can retain some element of control over – or at least involvement in – the process.

Enoch Brater suggests that ... but the clouds ... has more in common with Yeats than simply The Tower:

"Like the characters imagined in the play The Words upon the Window Pane, the 'he' we meet in ... but the clouds ... sits trance-like at a séance, calling out to a face and a voice to appear: 'Look at me' and then, echoing Hamlet's appeal to a quite different ghost, 'Speak to me.' A scene from Yeats is all but impossible to dismiss:"

Dr Trench: I thought she was speaking.
Mrs Mallet: I saw her lips move.

"As Katharine Worth has pointed out, in Yeatsian terminology 'shades' [the final word of Yeats's poem] necessarily conjures up thoughts of spirits or ghosts along with the onset of evening, and Beckett's play only reinforces this somewhat understated nuance." The prevalence of 'ghosts' in Beckett's later writings hardly needs commenting on.

John Calder in his review of the three plays shown on BBC2 had this to say about ... but the clouds ...:

"The man would appear ... to be immersed in guilt towards a missed opportunity, a dead love, a regretted course of action, as in Eh Joe, but with a flatter style. Irony is subdued, stoicism more matter of fact, self-pity almost entirely absent, illusion excluded. The man is concerned with concentration, a Merlin conjuring up a ghost in his memory."

Clearly the process in this play is open to interpretation. Is the process wholly internal, the man remembering someone real from his past or is he trying to conjure up some external manifestation of her, her ghost? And what is his motive for trying to evoke her? Is it simply to satisfy memory, to wallow in the moment awhile as Krapp does, or is she in some way his muse, an enabling force that makes the words come? Either way it is clear that he cannot control events directly, by the power of his will, things take place at best, as a byproduct almost of his actions, but more likely they are entirely out of his control and all he can do is wait on them.

== Music ==
A version with music by Martin Pearlman was produced at the 92nd Street Y in New York for the Beckett centennial in 2006.
