= Words and Music (play) =

Radio play by Samuel Beckett

Samuel Beckett wrote the radio play, Words and Music between November and December 1961. It was recorded and broadcast on the BBC Third Programme on 13 November 1962. Patrick Magee played Words and Felix Felton, Croak. Music was composed especially by John S. Beckett. The play first appeared in print in Evergreen Review 6.27 (November–December 1962). Beckett himself translated the work into French under the title Paroles et Musique (Minuit, 1966).

While John Fletcher considered Words and Music the weakest of Beckett's radio plays, Hugh Kenner considered it arguably the most moving work ever done for radio and Vivian Mercier praised it as one of Beckett's most powerful works along with Cascando (1961).

== Synopsis ==
The play takes place in what Katharine Worth describes as "an unidentified 'listening' space," another of Beckett's "skullscapes." The only specific location mentioned is "the tower" – perhaps a folly(?) – so the scene may well be in a castle or similarly large building of some kind with Croak in the role of châtelain.

Croak is a doddery old man, testy and maudlin. He is never referred to by name in the play itself but he is well named. Joe addresses to him – albeit somewhat obsequiously – as, "My Lord," since, despite his apparent frailty, he has plainly been someone used to wielding authority. There are only three sound effects used in the entire play, the shuffle [Beckett's descriptive stage direction) of Croak's feet as he arrives and departs, the thud/dropping of his club (staff?) reminiscent of the rulers wielded by the Animator in Rough for Radio II and the music teacher in Embers and the rapping of Music's baton reminiscent of a once prevalent practice among conductors of the past which is now far less widespread. The club and baton function as objects of authority. They form an interesting dyad prominently employed throughout the play.

For entertainment, Croak, (a Beckettian ‘old King Cole’) has only two old stalwarts to call on, his minstrels, Joe (Words) and Bob (Music). Each is heard to be possibly an abstraction and/or a being of some sort manifested through their respective vocabularies (music/words). Do they have actual physical form? This remains an unanswerable question. With radio remaining a solely sonic medium, we can only conjecture (Beckett sets up similar uncertainty in much of his work). Words/Music function in a way resembling court artists/musicians of the past. Word's repeatedly addressing Croak as "My Lord" and the strange formality to the domination both Words/Joe and Music/Bob seem accustomed to enduring adds an ancient (medieval?) or primitively regal aspect to the proceedings.

The modern shortened names (Joe, Bob) add a humorous contemporary contrast to the generally ancient (or timeless) seeming circumstances. The source of Croak's power over them is never explained or questioned-adding to the mysterious atmosphere.

Alfred Alvarez refers to Croak as "a poet" though there is no real evidence to suggest that he is. In fact his utterances throughout the play are terse: moans, groans and murmurings mainly along with a few short lines (commands, entreaties or outbursts). That said, he appears to appreciate poetry especially when set to music. The first theme Croak proclaims for the evening's diversion is "Love." Beckett offers several clues to help imagine Croak as a specific character. His shuffling feet, choice of themes, self-torturing reminiscence and intense reactions to much of what Words and Music produce/perform all seem to indicate that he is a decrepit version of Orsino with his famous opening line from Twelfth Night: "If music be the food of love, play on," a hopeless romantic, in love with love, and the melancholy brought on by the mere thought of it. Croak could almost be the selfsame man, had he never moved from that spot for the rest of his life and now finds himself perhaps approaching the brink of death. Or does this gathering occur again and again outside time? So many Beckett works present characters seemingly caught in endless cycles of repetition (those who wait in "Waiting for Godot"/the appearing-disappearing woman in "Ill Seen Ill Said"/The urn-dwelling trio in "Play" etc.) that this is always a possibility.

Additional related aspects of Love that Croak focuses on as sub-themes are "Age," "Face," (With two foreshadowing mentions earlier on in the play-once by Croak and then latter by Words) and the climactic naming of "Lily" which is discussed later regarding its various implications. After this iteration Croak is reduced to groans, an anguished "No!" and the eventual dropping of his "club" followed by shuffling away. His entrance/exit frames the main body of the play.

=== Prelude ===
The going is not easy; from the very beginning it's obvious that Words and Music do not enjoy each other's company. The play opens with Music – a small orchestra – tuning up much to the irritation of Words who is trying to rehearse a soliloquy on the unlikely theme of sloth. The orchestra interrupts him in the middle of his speech and again at the end when he's straining to hear if their master is approaching. Squabbling servants appear often in the works of Shakespeare summoning another parallel. Joe is much like Malvolio, the strait-laced, pompous steward in the household of Lady Olivia, efficient but also self-righteous, with a poor opinion of drinking, singing, and fun. His priggishness and haughty attitude earn him the enmity of Maria, Olivia's sharp-witted waiting-gentlewoman. There are moments of jealousy and competitiveness between Words and Music that seem at times relatively overt, adding dimension to their relationship.

Croak shuffles into the room and Joe and Bob both become habitually subservient. They've probably been together for a great many years, like Hamm and Clov, and rubbing each other the wrong way has become a means of entertaining themselves when they're not performing for their master. They could be viewed as prisoners who cannot escape torturing one another. Croak realizes they will have been bickering and gently reproves them: "My comforts! Be friends." He apologises for being late and offers a vague excuse: "The face … On the stairs … In the tower." He apparently doesn't need to explain further. "The face" will be taken up later on and bring Croak added anguish. He seems magnanimous at first but soon enough reveals his impatience, condescension, tyranny and raging.

=== Love ===
Croak considers for a moment and then announces the primary theme for the night's entertainment: Love. He calls for his club and thumps it on the ground: "Love!" We now realise that Joe may have been mocking the old man in his earlier disquisition on sloth. The speech he delivers is practically identical to the one he was rehearsing before when the play opens; he has simply swapped 'sloth' with 'love'. It is empty rhetoric. At one point he even stumbles and says 'sloth' by mistake. The feeling is that it wouldn't matter what the theme chosen was this was the speech he was intending to deliver: "'one-size-fits-all' verbiage ... Polonius could not have done better." Croak is displeased and calls on Bob to offer his sounds based on the theme-his "interpretation," if you will. Croak is still unhappy and wants the music louder. Joe interrupts, overstepping the mark with a jester's veracity: "What? Is love the word? … Is soul the word? … Do we mean love when we say love? … Soul, when we say soul? … Do we? … Or don’t we?"

Croak finally cries out for Bob's assistance and the recital turns into a shambles.

Once everything has calmed down he sets a new topic: Age.

=== Age ===
Joe's words are nowhere near as eloquent here. He had prepared one speech and now has to improvise a second. Does his master mean old age? He's not sure. His speech falters and Croak doesn't put up with him for long. It's unclear if he is trying to mimic an old man's speech pattern or if he has genuinely been caught off guard. Bob's music is also endured for only a short time. Croak's solution is a simple one, force the rivals to work together. They object but acquiesce.

Stefan-Brook Grant has proposed the term "fugue", an imitative compositional technique, to describe the initial attempts of Joe and Bob to work together. At the very least there is a contrapuntal aspect to the repetitions and echoes that eventually combine in mutual performance. The term fugue may be stretching things a bit but is not far off the mark. At first Joe offers a few words, which Bob tries to present as a musical phrase but soon it's clear that things work better if Joe adds words to Bob's music. Music takes on the role of leader and offers "suggestions" as they are described in Beckett's repeated stage directions. In this way they stumble through the construction of the first "aria" as Vivian Mercier refers to each of the two short poems, the first of which was published separately as Song (considering this title "aria" may be a bit of an exaggeration) in Collected Poems (1984).

After their initial run through, line-by-line, Bob plays the whole piece and then invites Joe to sing along, which he does his best to. The result is less actual singing than 'sprechtstimme.' It is a song about age but it is also about lost love. Perhaps Croak's "comforts" are beginning to grasp what their master really needs to hear. "For the first time Croak [is able to] direct his attention to the subject of the recitation rather than to its form." "Specifics replace slippery abstractions, the active replaces the passive voice ... clumsy and tentative, Joe has achieved resonance in reaching Croak’s memory." Croak makes no comment whatsoever after they have finished but one senses approval because he opens up an altogether more intimate topic: "the face".

=== The Face ===
Bob starts off this time with a "warmly sentimental" melody lasting about a minute. Joe's response is poetic enough but his description of the face seen by starlight is presented in "a cold, rather precise and prosaic" manner; old habits die hard. Bob again recommends a softer tone but Joe immediately blurts out the description he believes his master is looking for, (a somewhat oblique one) that of a young man who, having just experienced an orgasm, and taken a moment to gather himself, now looks again on the face of his lover lying together with her in a field of rye.

Croak groans. This is not right. Joe thinks he understands now and tempers his delivery. He describes the woman's "black disordered hair" and the look of concentration on her face; eyes closed, (Croak calls out in anguish: "Lily!") breasts heaving, biting her lip – she is in the throes of ecstasy. Suddenly Bob bursts in and interrupts this scene of coitus at the very point of climax presenting it as a moment of triumph, drowning out Joe's protestations. Like Henry in Embers, Words cannot express what is beyond words, and so, it is up to Music to communicate the climactic moment.

When Joe gets to speak again he has calmed down. In a gentle expostulatory manner Joe describes the scene as the couple collect themselves before changing his tone to a more poetic one. With the aid of Bob the two compose a second "aria"/"song" which they perform together as before describing the man's eyes moving down the woman's body toward "that wellhead". "One glimpse of "that wellhead" of another being's inmost Being, down there beyond the opened eyes – that is the most [Beckett's] heroes can even gain and, having gained, forever try to recapture" – like the old men in ... but the clouds ..., Ohio Impromptu, Ghost Trio and, of course, Krapp.

At the end of this Joe looks over at his master and what he sees shocks him: "My Lord!" Croak's club slips from his hand and we hear it land on the ground but he is not dead; the "'morose delectation' of remembered bygone sexual encounters has overwhelmed him". He gets up and shuffles off leaving his "comforts" alone.

=== Postlude ===
"It seems [Joe] has lost his power to express himself through words and, in contrast to his initial protestations during Music's tuning session, he now implores [Bob] to continue, as if admitting defeat. The play ends with what we might perceive to be our own natural non-rational and immediate expression of hopelessness; the word is reduced to a human sigh in the play's concluding sound."

== Interpretation ==
Various readings of what the situation in Words and Music might represent have emerged from critical studies of the work:

- Vivian Mercier treats the three characters as separate beings, Croak being an "old man who shuffles in" asking Words and Music to be friends.
- Eugene Webb suggests that "Croak is the name the dialogue directions give to the conscious self of the artist".
- Charles Lyons says that "[i]n Words and Music Beckett provides three characters who seem to represent different psychic functions of a single consciousness … [however] Beckett does not integrate them into the image of a specific, whole person." Also a number of times Lyons hints at the autobiographical nature of the piece though without providing any real evidence. It is certainly true that every artist reveals something of himself-whether consciously or not-in whatever he/she produces.
- John Fletcher refers to Croak as Beckett's "toppled Prospero . . . with Words as his Caliban and Music his Ariel."
- Clas Zilliacus proposes that in this play, "a mental process is unfolding," whereby Croak "instigates two of his faculties, at odds with each other, to provide him with solace and entertainment." Zilliacus also offers a view of the play in the light of medieval lyric, suggesting that the "master and servant motif familiar from other Beckett works here appears in recognisably feudal costume".
- Stefan-Brook Grant reminds us too that, "Words and Music was a commissioned work from the Third Programme. Croak, therefore, can be interpreted as the commissioner of the play, while Words is Samuel Beckett's work and Music, John Beckett's. The two instruments, therefore, actually originate from separate sources, and are required to rehearse and combine forces in order to achieve a satisfactory rendering of certain themes."

Ultimately most critics agree that Words and Music is a "composition about composition". Of course, a theme running through all of Beckett's writing has been the impossibility of meaningful expression through words alone and, in that respect, Joe doesn't disappoint. Croak wants to feel. He wants to wallow in a moment, exactly as Krapp does. He doesn't want to know. He doesn't need to understand. What is there to understand? Viewed purely as a means of communication, people revert to lovemaking to express their feelings, to 'say' what words can't say.

If Croak is a writer, or the personification of the creative aspect of a writer, then he demonstrates precious little control over his thoughts and his feelings. Perhaps he reflects Beckett's own, sometimes agonizing struggles with creativity when it appears at its most uncooperative. When the pair eventually do get their "act" together what is produced, which from all accounts is what Croak sought all along, is far too painful for him to bear.

"Words, in the end, are [Beckett’s] material – not as literature but in terms of something akin to silence; the desire is not to control or empower but to listen. Words are a function of listening for Beckett, listening within a silence of being where the world is effaced."

For Beckett, writing can be equated to seeing, it is a visual art that aspires to the ideal status of music: "music is the idea itself, unaware of the world of phenomena", "the ultimate imageless language of emotion." It is not so surprising then, when Katharine Worth asked Beckett about the relationship between the two figures in this radio play, he said: "Music always wins." Similarly, Beckett told Theodor W. Adorno "that it definitely ends with the victory of music". In what way though? They struggle together to get to this point but is it meaning that has finally overpowered Croak or is it his reawakened feelings? Is this why Words are rendered speechless by the play's end?

=== Music ===
Considering the importance Beckett places on the role of music in this play, it is worthwhile looking at how three of his collaborations were handled.

"The concerns of Words and Music are clearly related to Beckett’s general preoccupation with the limitations of the expressive powers of language. However, the fact that the music could not be composed by Beckett and therefore changes with the individual composer involved in each production has always rendered the word-music opposition, and hence the play as a whole, somewhat problematic. Beckett gives some instructions to the composer regarding the character of the music (asking for responses to specific concepts – 'Love', 'Age' and 'Face' – and demanding music of 'great expression', 'Love and soul music' and 'spreading and subsiding music'), but this gives no indication of style or material content."

What is perhaps most amazing is the lack of input Beckett chose to have. According to James Knowlson, "John Beckett … wrote his music for [this] play, totally independently of Beckett." Beckett's conversation with Everett Frost, who directed the play in the 1980s, sheds a slightly different light on things: "Beckett apologised that, now at an advanced age and increasingly in poor health, he felt unable to enter once again into the kind of collaborative or consultative effort that he had once given his cousin, John."

Irrespective of how much support he did or did not get, John became diffident about his score (despite it having pleased Beckett at the time) and, when Katharine Worth asked his permission to use it in a later production she was politely told "that he had withdrawn it."

"I liked its austerity," she said, "and touches such as a faint suggestion of plainsong, which picked up the quasi-medieval notes in the text. It was hard to see why the composer had withdrawn it."

Worth approached Samuel Beckett to see "if there was any composer he would care to recommend; he suggested Humphrey Searle", one of the UK's foremost pioneers of serial music (whom he had met once in Paris), as a suitable replacement. Much to her surprise, Beckett expressed no pressing need to meet up with him to discuss approaches. "This seemed interestingly," she writes, "different from the degree of control he had been known to exert over directors and designers."

For many years the version most readily available on CD, has been Morton Feldman's, written in 1987. "The two men had met in Berlin in 1976. Feldman wanted to do something with Beckett for the Rome Opera. Beckett indicated that he didn’t like opera – and Feldman agreed. Out of this understanding grew the collaboration on Neither (1977), and Beckett's pleasure with that work accounts for the fact that he recommended Feldman for the music of Words and Music ten years later." The noteworthy thing is that when Beckett sent the text of Neither to Feldman he had never heard any of the composer's music.

Feldman's idiom is slow, shapeless and tentative; his mastery lies in "probing" sound; its material and sensuous characteristics, the haunting suggestion that his notes are surrounded by silences. This alone brings him into the Beckettian domain. In an interview Feldman stated:

"I never liked anyone else's approach to Beckett. I felt it was a little too easy; they were treating him as if he were an existentialist hero, rather than a tragic hero. And he's a word man, a fantastic word man. And I always felt that I was a note man. I think that's what brought me to him. A kind of shared longing: this saturated, unending longing that he has, and that I have."
