= Martin Pearlman =

American conductor, harpsichordist, composer and early music specialist

Martin Pearlman (born May 21, 1945 in Chicago) is an American conductor, harpsichordist, composer, and early music specialist. He founded the first permanent Baroque orchestra in North America with Boston Baroque (originally called Banchetto Musicale) in 1973–74. Many of its original players went on to play in or direct other ensembles in what became a growing field in the American music scene. He later founded the chorus of that ensemble and was the music director of Boston Baroque from its inception up to 2025. He retired as director at the end of the 2024–25 season.

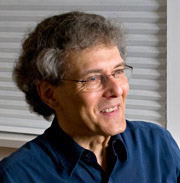
Martin Pearlman – photo by Susan Wilson.

== Early life and education ==
Born in Chicago, Illinois, Pearlman received training in composition, violin, piano, and theory. He received a B.A. in 1967 from Cornell University, where he resided at the Telluride House, studied composition with Karel Husa and Robert Moffat Palmer and began studying harpsichord with Donald Paterson.

== Career ==
After Cornell, Mr. Pearlman studied harpsichord with renowned harpsichordist and early music pioneer Gustav Leonhardt in Amsterdam on a Fulbright Grant (1967–68). In 1971, he received an M. M. in composition from Yale University, studying composition with Yehudi Wyner and harpsichord with noted harpsichordist Ralph Kirkpatrick, and worked in the electronic music studio.

In 1971, he moved to Boston, where he won the Erwin Bodky competition as a harpsichordist and began performing widely in solo recitals and concertos. In 1973–74, he founded Boston Baroque (which was called Banchetto Musicale until 1992). With that ensemble, he has conducted many American and world period-instrument premieres of operas, choral works, and instrumental works, including Mozart operas and major works of Bach, Handel and Monteverdi. He has directed Boston Baroque in an annual subscription series in Boston, toured with the ensemble in the U.S. and Europe, and made recordings (principally for Telarc International), three of which have been nominated for Grammy awards (see www.bostonbaroque.org).

With modern-instrument ensembles, Pearlman made his Kennedy Center debut conducting The Washington Opera in Handel's Semele, led the National Arts Center Orchestra of Ottawa in the Monteverdi Vespers, and has conducted the Minnesota Orchestra in Minneapolis, the Utah Opera in Salt Lake City, Opera Columbus, Boston Lyric Opera, San Antonio Symphony, the New World Symphony, Omaha Symphony, Alabama Symphony and others.

Pearlman is the only conductor from the period-instrument field to have performed live on the internationally televised Grammy Awards show.

Although conducting is his main focus, Pearlman is also a composer and an acclaimed harpsichordist and scholar.

Recent compositions include: a string quartet, piano works, a comic chamber opera The Life and Opinions of Tristram Shandy; his 3-act Finnegans Grand Operoar: an Operoar on texts by James Joyce; The Creation According to Orpheus for piano, harp and percussion soloists with string orchestra; Beethoven Fantasy op. 77 for solo piano, and music for three Samuel Beckett plays (Words and Music (play), Cascando, ... but the clouds ...), commissioned by the 92nd Street Y in New York for the Beckett centennial in 2006 and produced there and at Harvard University in Cambridge, Massachusetts.

As a harpsichordist, Pearlman has won Boston’s Erwin Bodky Competition, and was a prizewinner at the Festival of Flanders competition in Bruges, Belgium.

Pearlman has also edited a new critical edition of Armand-Louis Couperin’s complete keyboard works, which has been published for free online. He has also completed new performing versions of Monteverdi's operas Il ritorno d'Ulisse and L'incoronazione di Poppea, and created a new orchestration and edition of Cimarosa's Il maestro di cappella. He has served as a Professor of Music in the Historical Performance department at Boston University, College of Fine Arts.

== Discography ==
=== Conducting Boston Baroque on Linn Records ===
- Biber, The Mystery Sonatas (played continuo; Christina Day Martinson, violin soloist)
- Haydn, Lord Nelson Mass and Symphony No. 102 in Bb
- Haydn, The Creation (Die Schöpfung)
- Monteverdi, Il ritorno d'Ulisse in patria

=== Conducting Boston Baroque on Telarc International ===
- Bach, Brandenburg Concertos
- Bach, The Four Orchestral Suites
- Bach Magnificat & Vivaldi Gloria
- Bach, Mass in B Minor
- Cherubini, Requiem in C minor (with Beethoven, Elegischer Gesang and * Cherubini, Marche Funèbre)
- Gluck, Iphigénie en Tauride (with Christine Goerke, Rodney Gilfrey, Vinson Cole)
- Handel, Messiah
- Handel, Concerti grossi, op. 6 (complete)
- Handel, Music for the Royal Fireworks and Water Music (complete)
- Monteverdi, Vespers of 1610
- Mozart, Arias for Male Soprano (with Michael Maniaci, soprano)
- Mozart, Requiem (completion by Robert Levin)
- Mozart, Jupiter Symphony and Flute Concertos (with Jacques Zoon, flute)
- Mozart, The Impresario (Der Schauspieldirektor) and The Beneficent Dervish (Der wohltätige Derwisch), Singspiel by Emanuel Schikaneder
- Mozart et al., Der Stein der Weisen (The Philosopher's Stone), world premiere recording of singspiel from Schikaneder's theater.
- Music of the American Moravians ("Lost Music of Early America")
- Purcell, Dido and Aeneas and orchestral works
- Vivaldi, The Four Seasons (with Christina Day Martinson, violin)

=== Earlier recordings conducting Banchetto Musicale ===
- Mozart, Coronation Mass and Solemn Vespers (Harmonia Mundi)
- Haydn, Lord Nelson Mass (Arabesque)
- Handel, L'Allegro, il Penseroso ed il Moderato (Arabesque)

=== Solo harpsichord recordings on LP ===
- Music of the Couperin Family: Louis, François, and Armand-Louis (Titanic)
- Scarlatti sonatas (Titanic)

== Editions and completions ==
- Armand-Louis Couperin, critical edition of the complete music for one and two harpsichords (includes completions of two Quatuors for two harpsichords).
- Monteverdi, L'incoronazione di Poppea, performing edition.
- Monteverdi, Il ritorno d'Ulisse in patria, performing edition.
- Cimarosa, Il maestro di cappella, orchestration and edition (from surviving piano reduction).
- Moravian music, performing editions from manuscripts of 33 works, recorded with Boston Baroque for Telarc International.
- Purcell, The Comical History of Don Quixote, performing version.
- Mozart, Lo sposo deluso, completion of surviving fragments.

== See also ==
- Boston Baroque
