= Ghost Trio =

Ghost Trio may refer to:

- Piano Trios, Op. 70 (Beethoven), by Ludwig van Beethoven
- Ghost Trio (play), a television play by Samuel Beckett which reflects Beethoven's trio
