= That Time =

Play by Samuel Beckett

That Time is a one-act play by Samuel Beckett, written in English between 8 June 1974 and August 1975. The play was specially written for actor Patrick Magee, who delivered its first performance on the occasion of Beckett's seventieth birthday celebration, at London's Royal Court Theatre on 20 May 1976.

== Synopsis ==
=== Listener ===
On stage, the audience is confronted with the head of a man in his dotage about ten feet above the stage and slightly off-centre; everything else is in darkness. The man has flaring white hair and remains silent apart from his slow and regular breathing which is amplified. Beckett identified the old man as being inspired by Laozi (“that old Chinaman long before Christ” (B3)). In early drafts Beckett has the head resting on a pillow recalling especially the dying, bedridden Malone. The text requires that Listener open and close his eyes (which stay shut for most of the time) and hold a smile – "toothless for preference" – at the very end of the performance.

The actor responds to three sets of reminiscences that come at him from all sides according to a predetermined sequence. These voices describe a life of self-induced isolation and retrospection and each of these three journeys into the past reinforces his sense of solitude. For company, he has made up stories and now, after years suffering from "the Time cancer", has considerable difficulty differentiating between fact and fiction.

Beckett required that these monologues, although featuring the same actor, were to be pre-recorded and not presented live. He also specified that the voices come from three locations preferably, from the left, the right and from above the actor and that the switch from one to the other be smooth and yet clearly noticeable. He did not stipulate, however, that any effort be made to differentiate between the voices unless it were impractical to have them coming from three distinct locations; in that instance he asked for a change in pitch to be used to distinguish one from another.

"The B story has to do with the young man, the C story is the story of the old man and the A story is that of the man in middle age," he explained.

The significance of the final smile is not clear and a source of much speculation. The fact that the 'natural order' (BAC – see below) is restored and maintained in the third round is an unlikely reason because Beckett changed the pattern only in the last revision, and so it is a doubtful explanation for the smile that had been previously included in earlier drafts. “Is it a … smile of relief and contentment that at last all the torment is nearly over? A wry reflection on the insignificance of the individual human existence in the context of infinity?” Does Listener smile because he finally recognizes himself in the different selves of his memory? Beckett has not explained. All that can be said for certain is that the story – indeed the man's life – has “come and gone … in no time” (C12) words which echo Vladimir's at the end of Waiting for Godot: “Astride of a grave and a difficult birth.” In the 1977 German production, directed by Beckett himself, he did make one addition to the final scene: Klaus "Herm’s smile ... merged with his audible panting into a single scornful exhale-laugh – Beckett’s last minute inspiration."

=== A ===
Voice A is that of maturity. The man returns for a "last time" (A1) to the town he grew up in and tries unsuccessfully to reach the folly where he hid as a child of between ten and twelve (A4/A10) looking at a “picture book” (A3) and talking to himself for company (A9), making up “imaginary conversations” while his family were out in the dark looking for him (A4). The trams no longer run (A1) and the railway station is “all closed down and boarded up” (A6). Dejected he sits in a doorway making up stories of the past (A11) while he waits for the night ferry, never intending to return (A7).

=== B ===
Voice B is that of youth. It describes sitting with a girl beside a wheat field exchanging vows of affection, (B1) then lying with her in the sand (B7) and subsequently being alone in the same settings (B9). In each instance there is unusually no taction contact suggesting his inability to extrapolate beyond the point of simply being with another. These events appear to be reviewed at a turning point in his life: whilst sitting beside a window in the dark listening to an owl hooting he has been remembering/imagining a first-love scenario but then finds he can't continue and has to give up trying to (B12).

=== C ===
Voice C is that of old age. By this time he is content to seek shelter (and a degree of privacy) in public places like the Post Office (C9), the Public Library (C11) and the Portrait Gallery (C1). In the gallery he sees a face reflected in the glass and doesn't quite recognise himself (C3). All his life he has lived in the past – all the voices are reflective – but now he is confronted with a reflection which is current, his own. The text with which the play closes, a ‘vision’ in the library where all the books have dissolved into dust (C12) evokes God's admonition to Adam, “dust thou art; unto dust shalt thou return” (Genesis 3:19)

== Genesis ==
Beckett initially wrote continuous prose for each of the three voice-aspects, then intercalated them into 36 verse paragraphs which are presented in a manner similar to Play according to the following order:

A1	C1	B1	A2	C2	B2	A3	C3	B3	C4	A4	B4	PAUSE	BREATH
C5	B5	A5	C6	B6	A6	C7	B7	A7	B8	C8	A8	PAUSE	BREATH
B9	A9	C9	B10	A10	C10	B11	A11	C11	B12	A12	C12	PAUSE	SMILE

Beckett is known to have had a long-standing preoccupation with musical structure. Time duration dictated where the breaks would come as he planned 3 x 5 minutes of speech with silences after 5 minutes and 10 minutes. The pauses “follow moments in which each of the voices confronts a moment of doubt, spatial, temporal or psychological confusion”.

Early drafts include many biographical reminiscence, some of which still makes their way into the final version. Barrington's Tower became Foley's Folly to capitalise on the alliteration, “the number 11 bus, [which] would only take him to the suburb of Clonskeagh leaving him with a five mile walk to” the folly and the “Doric terminus” is the boarded up Harcourt Street railway terminus in Dublin. The Portrait Gallery, Library and Post Office suggest London where Beckett lived for two years in the Thirties.

The title has a double meaning, referring to a specific period of time and also to time in general. This is clear from the French translation Beckett made where there is no one word which conveys this duplicity of meaning and although he opted for Cette Fois as the title in French, he translated ‘time’ as ‘fois’, ‘temps’ and ‘heure’ depending on the context.

== Common threads ==
Each voice in That Time has a subject area independent of the others at first, but as the play progresses, connections are made through common images and recurring themes. C's story takes place in winter (“always winter” (C1)); B's events take place in summer so it is logical to assume that A's tale happens in autumn (“grey day” (A1), “pale sun” (A8)). A sits on a stone step but remembers sitting on a stone in the folly, B sits on a stone by the wheat field and C on a marble slab in the portrait gallery linking the memories. The facts that the man's parents are both dead and the green greatcoat (“the distinguishing outer garb of many of Beckett’s characters”) left for him by his father are mentioned in A12 and C2.

Each of the three scenes created by Voices A, B, and C lays claim to being a “turning-point,” “that time” marking the “never the same but the same” when a self might possibly be able to “say I to yourself” (all quotes, C5).

The voices are trying throughout the play to place all the events in the right time order and also remember when in particular certain events occurred: “Was that the time or was that another time” (C6). Vivian Mercier in Beckett/Beckett asks: “Are they memories or fictions…? Is all memory a fictional process…?” (p 236) In each voice, the idea that the person is inventing people or events is stated or suggested, as when voice B says, “just one of those things you kept making up to keep out the void” (B4). These voices from Listener's past are not entities in their own right, they are how he now remembers/imagines the voices from that time. Listener is an omniscient narrator albeit a flawed one, which is why each of the voices has some insight into the others’ times and repeats phrases from at least one of the other time frames.

== Related Texts ==
=== Krapp’s Last Tape ===
In Krapp's Last Tape Beckett clearly instructs that the voice on the tapes be audibly different (“Strong voice, rather pompous, clearly Krapp’s at a much earlier time”) whereas in That Time the notes say simply, “Voices A B C are his own coming to him from both sides and above”, suggestive of the fact that these voices belong to the present time frame.

=== Kilcool ===
Considered as "a precursor to Not I and That Time," the “Kilcool manuscript” is an unpublished dramatic monologue that Beckett worked on and abandoned in 1963. In early drafts a female voice describes a move to Kilcool (Beckett's father had once rented a house in Kilcoole). She has lost both parents and the death of her mother troubles her in particular. In later drafts Beckett eliminated almost all naturalistic detail. The visual is of a "woman’s face alone in constant light. Nothing but fixed lit face and speech."

=== Film ===
The scene in the portrait gallery, where C experiences a terrifying moment of self-recognition, is similar to the one at the end of Film (film) (1965) where O is confronted with E, himself.

=== Eh Joe ===
At the end of Eh Joe, Beckett's first teleplay written in 1965, the protagonist Joe smiles after being assailed by the recurrent female voices in his head. The closing smile "may suggest an end to or a suppression of, at least for a time, the interrogating voices."

=== Not I ===
Beckett called That Time a "brother to Not I " (written in 1972) and later wrote to George Reavey: "Have written a short piece (theatre): That Time. Not I family". Additionally, because the later play was "cut out of the same texture" as Not I, he didn't want them on the same bill.

=== Company ===
First written in English in 1980 and described as a "long prose-poem", Company has affinities with That Time : "A voice comes to one in the dark. Imagine." Listener becomes "hearer" who "speaks of himself as another". Voices assail him "from one quarter and now from another", making up stories (the "fable of one with you in the dark") that "are coming to an end" in silence and solitude: "And you as you always were. Alone."
