= Embers =

Play written by Samuel Beckett

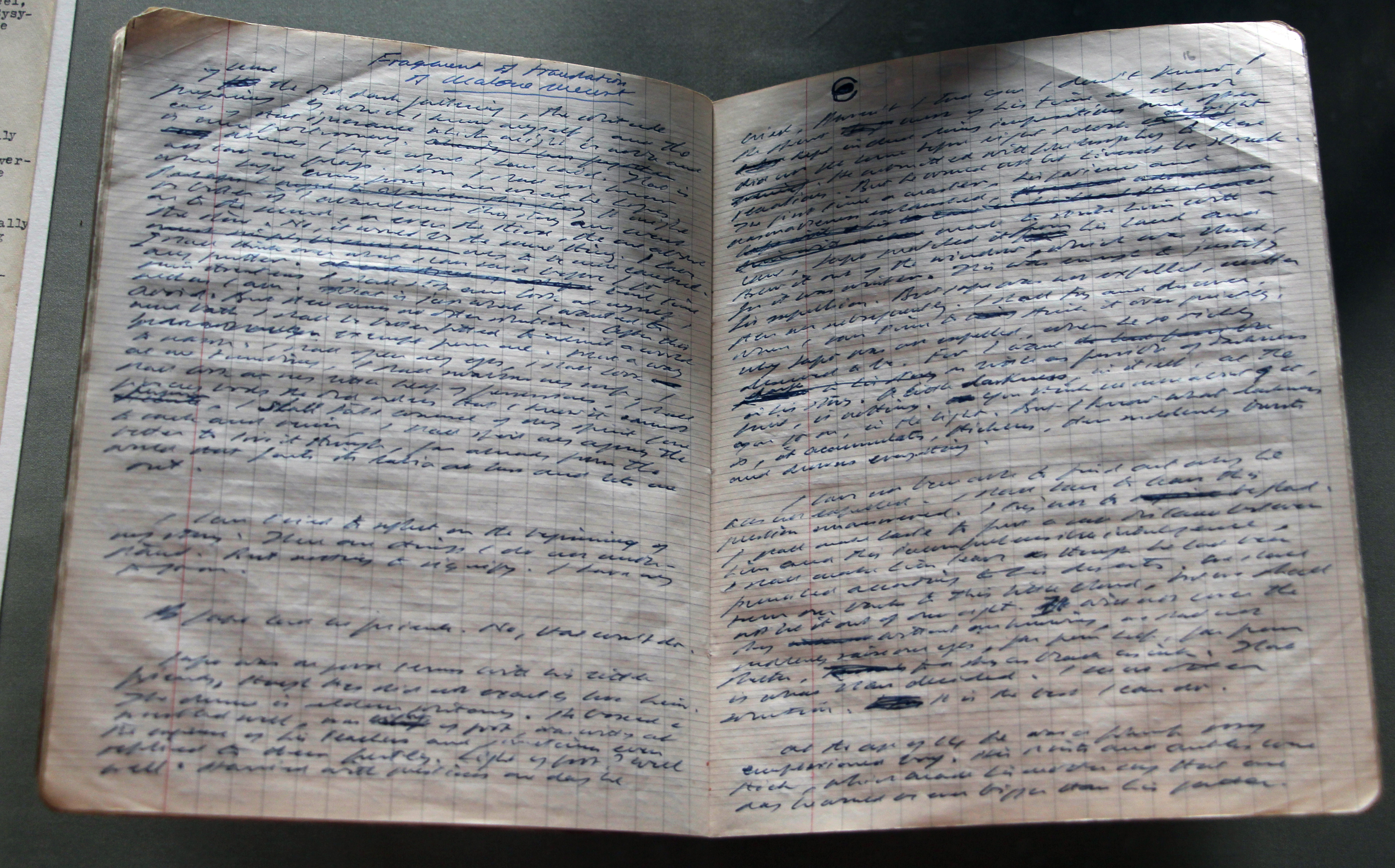
Manuscript of Embers from Trinity College Library

Embers is a radio play by Samuel Beckett. It was written in English in 1957. First broadcast on the BBC Third Programme on 24 June 1959, the play won the RAI prize at the Prix Italia awards later that year. Donald McWhinnie directed Jack MacGowran – for whom the play was specially written – as "Henry", Kathleen Michael as "Ada" and Patrick Magee as "Riding Master" and "Music Master". The play was translated into French by Beckett himself and Robert Pinget as Cendres and was published in 1959 by Les Éditions de Minuit. The first stage production was by the French Graduate Circle of Edinburgh, Edinburgh Festival, 1977."

The most recent version of Embers was broadcast in 2006 on BBC Radio 3 and directed by Stephen Rea. The cast included Michael Gambon as Henry, Sinéad Cusack as Ada, Rupert Graves, Alvaro Lucchesi and Carly Baker. This production was rebroadcast on BBC Radio 3 on 16 May 2010 as part of a double bill with a 2006 production of Krapp's Last Tape.

Opinions vary as to whether the work succeeds. Hugh Kenner calls it "Beckett’s most difficult work" and yet maintains that the piece "coheres to perfection," John Pilling disagrees, remarking that Embers "is the first of Beckett’s dramatic works that seems to lack a real centre," whereas Richard N. Coe considers the play "not only minor, but one of [Beckett’s] very few failures." Anthony Cronin records in his biography of Beckett that "Embers met with a mixed reception [but tempers this comment by noting that] the general tone of English criticism was somewhat hostile to Beckett" at the time.

The author's own view was that it was a "rather ragged" text. He said that it was "not very satisfactory, but I think just worth doing … I think it just gets by for radio."

For all his personal reservations the play won the RAI prize in the 1959 Prix Italia contest, not, as has been often reported, "the actual Prix Italia … which went to John Reeve’s play, Beach of Strangers."

== Synopsis ==
The play opens with the sea in the distance and the sound of footsteps on the shingle. Henry has been walking along the strand close to where he has lived his whole life, at one time or other on either side of "a bay or estuary".

Henry starts to talk, a single word, "on," followed by the sea again, followed by the voice – louder and more insistent this time, repeating the same word, as it will say, then repeat as a command, the words "stop" and "down." Each time, Henry obediently yet reluctantly does what his voice first says, then tells him to do, he stops and sits down on the shingle. Throughout the play, the sea acts like a character in its own right (much as the light in Play does).

=== The first monologue ===
The sea, it has always been assumed, was the cause of his father's death: "the evening bathe you took once too often", however, the next sentence tells us: "We never found your body, you know, that held up probate an unconscionable time". Nothing in the text explicitly says that Henry's father was suicidal – though this has been inferred from the story of Bolton and Holloway discussed later.

He imagines his father, whom he describes as "old … blind and foolish", sitting beside him on the beach and addresses the whole opening monologue to him, apart from a single aside to the audience, but the father never once responds. His father could never stay away from the sea and it seems neither can his son. "The sea presents an antithetical image to Henry. He must stay near it, and yet he attempts to distance himself from its sound." Even when he finally received his inheritance he only relocated to the other side of the bay; it has been a great many years since he actually swam in it. He tried once going to landlocked Switzerland but still could not get the sound of the sea out of his head.

To drown out the sound, rather than seek out company, he began making up stories but could never finish any of them. He remembers " a great one" and starts to tell it:

He describes a scene before a fire that is about to go out. A man, Bolton, is standing there in his dressing gown awaiting the arrival of his doctor, Holloway, who we learn later may be the name of Henry’s own doctor. It is late, past midnight. He hears the doorbell and goes to the window to check; it is winter and the ground is covered with snow. The doctor has arrived, a "fine old chap, six-foot, burly" standing there in his macfarlane, a heavy caped overcoat.

Bolton lets him in. Holloway wants to know why he was called for but he is cut short. Bolton pleads with him, "Please! PLEASE!" and then they stand there in silence, the doctor trying to warm himself by the fire, what is left of it, and his patient staring out the window. Only all is not silent, not entirely, there is the sound of a drip (evocative of the remark Hamm makes in Endgame: "There is something dripping in my head"); this agitates Henry greatly, and he breaks off his story there for a second.

Henry tells his father that, after a time, his stories were not company enough and he began feeling the need for someone from his past to be with him. He then continues:

Holloway is annoyed. Presumably, he understands what he’s being asked for but avoids showing that he does. Instead, he complains about the fact that, despite his being dragged out on a night like this, his old friend has not had the common decency to heat and light the room suitably let alone provide a proper welcome and some kind of refreshment. He says he is going to leave, regretting having come in the first place, but does not make any move to go.

Henry suddenly stops his story and jumps to the last time he saw his father alive. His father's eventual disappearance followed an angry interchange between the two of them. He wanted Henry to go swimming with him but Henry refuses and so the last words his father ends up saying to him are: "A washout, that’s what you are, a washout!" Whether his father was accidentally washed out to sea and drowned or deliberately killed himself is something no one knows for sure. Understandably Henry has punished himself for years over his decision not to go with him.

His relationship with his daughter had not been good either, a clingy child and, as we discover later, not particularly proficient or interested in anything she was required to do; Henry blames the "horrid little creature" for the break-up of his marriage. He re-enacts going for a walk with her and how he ended up reducing the girl to tears when she refuses to let go of his hand.

Henry treats Addie in much the same way his father appears to have treated him. He remembers: "That was always the way, walk all over the mountains with you talking and talking and then suddenly mum and home in misery and not a word to a soul for a week." "The consequent judgement that Henry was a 'sulky little bastard, better off dead' is consistent with his father's final verdict of his son as a 'washout'."

Out of the blue Henry calls out to his estranged, possibly ex, probably dead wife, Ada.

=== The dialogue ===
The central sequence involves a dialogue between Henry and Ada, which provokes three specific memories presented in the form of short "evocation[s]" involving other characters (each lasts only a few seconds). Each occasion ends in a character crying or crying out and is artificially cut short at that instant.

Before this, the two engage in quasi-domestic small talk. Ada wants to know where their daughter, Addie, is. Henry says she is with her music master. She chides him for sitting on the cold stones and offers to put her shawl under him, which he allows. She asks if he's wearing his long johns but Henry is difficult about answering her. The sound of hooves distracts him. Ada makes a joke about horses and tries to get him to laugh. He then returns to his old preoccupation, the sound of the sea. He wants to go but Ada says they cannot because they're waiting on Addie. This triggers the first evocation.

In his first flashback Henry imagines the couple's daughter, with her overbearing music master. Addie first plays some scales and then begins a Chopin waltz, number 5 in A-flat major. "In the first chord of bass, bar 5, she plays E instead of F." The teacher strikes the piano with his cylindrical ruler and Addie stops playing. "Eff! Eff!” he insists and eventually has to show her the note. She starts again, makes the same mistake and has to endure his ranting again only this time he reduces his pupil to tears.

The second involves Addie again, this time with her riding instructor: "Now Miss! Elbows in Miss! Hands down Miss! (Hooves trotting.) Now Miss! Back straight Miss! Knees in Miss! (Hooves cantering.) Now Miss! Tummy in Miss! Chin up Miss! (Hooves galloping.) Now Miss! Eyes front Miss! (ADDIE begins to wail.) Now Miss! Now Miss!"

The third scene briefly recalls Henry forcing his attention on Ada, some twenty years earlier. It ends with Ada crying out, the cry merging with the sound of the sea, louder now. As before the scene is unceremoniously truncated.

Ada suggests that he consult Holloway about his talking. This was a source of some embarrassment to her when they were together. She cites an instance where she has to explain to their daughter why her father was talking to himself in the lavatory. She cannot understand why such "a lovely peaceful gentle soothing sound" should upset him so and refuses to believe that his talking helps drown it out. He tells he that he's even taken to "walk[ing] about with [a] gramophone" but forget it this day.

He reminds Ada that it was on this very beach they had sex for the first time. She'd shown great reluctance and they had to wait a long time before the coast was clear. She did not get pregnant right away however and it was years before they had Addie. He wonders what age the girl is now but – unexpectedly for a mother – Ada says she does not know. He proposes going for a row, "to be with my father", he tells her but, again, she reminds him that their daughter will be coming soon and would be upset to find him gone.

Henry explains to Ada that his father does not talk with him like she does. She is not surprised and predicts that a day will come when there will be no one left and he will be alone with only his own voice for company. She remembers meeting his family in the midst of having a row, his father, mother and a sister threatening to kill herself. The father storms out slamming the door, as he did the day he disappeared for good (if this is in fact not the same day), but she passes him later sitting staring out to sea (bear in mind Henry said his father was blind) in a posture that reminded her of Henry himself.

"Is this rubbish a help to you, Henry? [she wonders out loud.] "I can try and go on a little if you wish." He fails to answer though and so she slips out of his consciousness.

=== The second monologue ===
He says he is not ready and begs her to stay even if she will not speak and "Henry improvises upon her story, attempting to build it into a more complex and extended narrative but he fails". What is interesting here is that Henry imagines that Ada, after witnessing his father sitting on the rock, gets on the tram (possibly horse-driven) to go home, then alights and returns to check on him only to find the beach empty. Was she the last person to see him alive?

Resigning himself to being alone Henry picks up the Bolton story from where he left off:

The doctor says if Bolton wants an injection – "meaning an anaesthetic" – just to let down his trousers and he’ll give him one but Bolton does not reply. Instead, he starts playing with the blind, drawing it up and then letting it fall, like an eye blinking. This infuriates Holloway and he insists Bolton stop which he does. Instead he lights a candle and, holding it "above his head, walks over and looks Holloway full in the eye" but still says nothing. This obviously makes the doctor uncomfortable. He again offers to give him an injection but Bolton wants something else, something he has obviously asked for before and the doctor has refused to go through with, possibly to administer a lethal injection rather than merely a jab to dull the pain. "Please, Holloway!" he pleads one final time. There the story peters out with the two men standing eye to eye in silence.

Henry is like the "writer-protagonists of the novels, using their speech/writing to fill the moments until death." But he finds he cannot go on. He curses, gets to his feet, walks over to the water's edge where he takes out and consults a pocket diary. With the exception of an appointment with the "plumber at nine [to attend to] the waste" pipe his future is empty. The play ends with no resolution other than the certainty that the next day and the next day will be the same as the previous ones.

== Interpretation ==
Since Embers can be interpreted in a variety of ways it is perhaps worthwhile considering what Beckett said to Jack MacGowran, not specifically about this play, but about all his writing:

"Beckett told me that when I came to a passage with several meanings, the obvious one is the right one. He told me he did not create symbols where they did not exist, only where they are apparent. He kept repeating that line from Watt – 'no symbols where none intended'. At the time he was very annoyed with the symbol-hunting scholars who seemed to be breathing down his neck all the time."

Henry, the central character in this play, cannot find the words to articulate his situation and fills in the blanks with what he can in an effort to make sense of things. In this context, the play is its own metaphor. Words have become redundant, but they are all Henry has to explain the unexplainable. If critics get frustrated because there are no answers then they've got the point.

=== Sound effects ===
"Beckett’s paradoxical endeavour to question sound in this radio play is [partly] achieved through the use of grossly made sound effects (coconut-like sound of hooves, exaggerated amplifications of Addie’s cries, etc.)."

The sound of the sea dominates the play but it is not an accurate representation and deliberately so. Henry warns us that the sea sound effects are not perfect and this casts doubt as to whether he is even on the beach at all; perhaps everything in the play is taking place within his head.

The pioneering sound engineer Desmond Briscoe was responsible for the sound of the sea in the original BBC production. This was his second collaboration with Beckett (he also worked on All That Fall) only this time he "utilized a more traditionally 'musical' approach, moulding the abstract sound of the sea using distinct pitches."

"Henry also demands certain sound effects to provide a contrast to the monotony of the sea. He twice asks for the sound of hooves, hoping that the 'ten-ton mammoth' can be trained to mark time; have it 'stamp all day' and 'tramp the world down'. He similarly asks for a drip, as if the sea could be drained by the sound effect."

=== Henry ===
Beckett himself, Zilliacus believes, has made the most important point about Embers: "‘Cendres,’ he remarked in an interview with P.L. Mignon, ‘repose sur une ambiguité: le personage a-t-il une hallucination ou est-il en présence de la réalité?’" (Embers rests on an ambiguity: is the person having an hallucination or is this really happening?) Paul Lawley feels the need to qualify this statement however: "The most important point [perhaps], but one to start from rather than conclude with."

Like many of Beckett's characters (e.g. Molloy, May in Footfalls), Henry is a writer or at the very least a storyteller, albeit by his own admission, a poor one never actually finishing anything he starts. Fortunately, he does not need to depend on his writing for a living. He may or may not commit what he has written to paper but he performs the core function of a writer, the creation of stories. And as a writer, he also needs readers or listeners to hear what he has to say. Like the old woman in Rockaby he only has himself and the voices in his head left to acknowledge his existence however pathetic that existence has become.

Henry is undoubtedly a tormented soul. He interrogates the past rigorously but never gets round to actually verbalising what is really on his mind: How did his father die? Was he, in any way, responsible for that death? Is vital information missing or has he repressed it? Is this why he can never complete any of his stories because they are all really the same story and are all missing that something? His life is like a sentence (pun intended) – it reached a comma with his father's death and he has been unable to satisfactorily finish it. He has no "professional obligations", no familial ties and now not even a woman to justify his hanging around this place like, as he puts it, an "old grave I cannot tear myself away from".

=== The Sea ===
Henry's initial monologue focuses on his fixation with the sound of the sea. Right at the start he even says, "That sound you hear is the sea … I mention it because the sound is so strange, so unlike the sound of the sea, that if you did not see what it was you would not know what it was." "The 'you' here can be taken to be the dead father, with whom Henry is sitting on the strand. But if so, it makes little sense since, as we soon learn, the father lived at the sea's edge all his life and presumably would know how the sea sounds. Henry's information thus functions ironically, or even metalinguistically: on the one hand, it shows the narrator having a brief moment of power over the father whose death haunts him; on the other, we can read the speech as an aside to the audience," emphasising that everything they are experiencing is a part of a fiction, even the sea. Jonathan Kalb has even suggested that everything including the sea and the beach are all merely figments of Henry's imagination.

The images (symbols and metaphors) that spring to mind when people see the sea (another pun Beckett cannot have failed to notice) have become somewhat clichéd over the years and Beckett takes full advantage of this fact; literature (not forgetting the visual arts) has done much of his groundwork for him.

The sound of the sea continues throughout the play always "moving according to the temporal laws of the tide" suggesting a linearality to the timeline but the action is grouped by association rather than presented in a chronological order. The omnipresent sea is less of a natural phenomenon than another mental ghost haunting him no matter where he goes, even reacting to events (e.g. during the sex scene) by getting louder; it clearly has its own voice or perhaps it is all that remains of his father's voice since it represents his grave. Either way the sea is a constant reminder of death and Henry's attempts to drown out its sound "seem to manifest the typical Beckett antithesis: the desire for death and the desire to keep it at bay by continued speech".

Beckett's own father (actually a superb swimmer) died at home, of a heart attack it has to be said, on 26 June 1933. In October his mother rented "a little house by the sea just beyond Dalkey Harbour. Beckett accompanied her, laden with his books, manuscripts and typewriter. But he never settled down there and questioned 'how people have the nerve to live so near, on the sea. It moans in one’s dreams at night.'" The beach there – "by contract with most Irish beaches – is notoriously composed of shingle and pebble".

In May 1954 he received a phone call from his sister-in-law to let him know that his brother, Frank, had been diagnosed with terminal lung cancer. Beckett spent several months there up until his brother's eventual death in September. "Most evenings he walked alone after dinner along the seashore below the house"

=== Henry’s father ===
"'To "act" it is to kill it': 'radio text,’ Beckett here reminds us, is par excellence an art that depends on sound alone and hence cannot be converted to the stage. Furthermore, the sound in question is not just that of the human voice but includes a complex network of nonverbal elements, musical or otherwise. It makes little sense, then, to complain, as does John Pilling, that Beckett should have included the voice of Henry's father, along with Ada's and Addie's voices, in the play:

'The puzzling thing is that Henry's control over voices does not extend to the most crucial figure of all, his father … The failure to incorporate into the physical existence of the play its most important figure is not so much a failure of conception – though it might have served to link Henry's life to his story of Bolton – as of tact. There seems to be no good reason for the omission.'

"But there is a very good reason for the omission, which is that, unlike the theatre, radio makes it possible to represent characters by means of metonymic sound images: The ghost of Henry's father is indeed "heard" throughout the play: not only when his son acts the role of medium, imitating such parental exhortations as "Are you coming for a dip?", but also in the recurrent "Please! PLEASE!" that Bolton addresses to Holloway, and, most important, in the voice of the sea itself."

Henry tells us at the very start of the play that his father is blind and yet when Ada passes him she makes mention that he did not see her. As Henry is not only talking to his father at the start it is also true that he is talking to a "blind" audience too. Is the man actually blind or even figuratively blind? Perhaps Ada was unaware that he was blind though think seems unlikely.

"As their names suggest, Ada and Addie may not be wife and daughter at all, not even imagined wife and daughter, only father-surrogates: Ada is a near anagram of Dad and Addie a rhyme for Daddie. And Henry himself? Is he perhaps just another of the fictional characters? Ruby Cohn notes that 'Henry is a name derived from German Heimrih, meaning head of the family' he too is a father or father or father-surrogate – his own. Why should the figure of the father loom so large in every element of the play? Because the father, the head of the family, is its creator, and it is creation which is Henry's obligation."

=== Bolton and Holloway ===
Although the scene where the action takes place is ostensibly a beach, the real action all takes place inside Henry's head, which is why Beckett commentators generally speak of this kind of Beckettian dramatic setting as a "skullscape" or "soulscape." Paul "Lawley has suggested that the enigmatic scene with Bolton’s opening and shutting the heavy drapes enacts the blinking of an eye, the room thus becoming a skull," a skull-within-a-skull in fact.

A fuller appreciation of the story of Bolton and Holloway helps with an overall understanding of the rest of the play. Needless to say opinions differ. It is reminiscent of the story May tells in Footfalls where aspects of her and her mother are recast as "Amy" and "Mrs Winter".

==== Bolton = Henry ====
Hersh Zeifman, for whom Embers "dramatizes a quest for salvation, a quest which, as always, ultimately proves fruitless," sees this scene as "a paradigm of human suffering and divine rejection":

Bolton’s desperate plea to Holloway for help mirrors the confrontation between Henry and his father. Bolton is thus a surrogate for Henry—implicitly identified with Christ as sufferer. Both his name (Bolton) and the fact that he wears a red dressing gown (the colour is repeated three times in the text) link him with the Crucifixion (before Christ was nailed to the cross, he was dressed in a scarlet robe). And Holloway, the recipient of Bolton’s supplication, is a surrogate for Henry’s father—implicitly identified with Christ as saviour. Like Christ, Holloway is a physician, a potential healer of men’s souls. But the identification is an ironic one. The Physician of the Gospels exclaimed, 'I am the way, the truth and the life: no man cometh unto the Father, but by me' (John 14:6); the physician of Embers is a hollow-way, a way leading nowhere. And whereas Christ’s death on the cross at 'the ninth hour' represents birth into a new life and a promise of salvation, Holloway’s actions, likewise at the ninth hour, result in the death of new life, a universal denial of salvation: 'If it’s an injection you want, Bolton, let down your trousers and I’ll give you one, I have a panhysterectomy at nine' (italics added [by Zeifman]).

Lawley's contention could equally be valid in that "Henry is losing his creative impersonality and is consequently moving inexorably into identity with his fictional creation, Bolton."

Whereas most scholars take Bolton's begging to suggest he wants to die, Michael Robinson, in The Long Sonata of the Dead, puts forward a simpler interpretation:

"Into this tale in which Bolton … calls out his friend and doctor, Holloway, in the middle of an icy winter night, not because he is ill but because he is alone, Henry puts all his own isolation and desire for companionship. He does this with great imaginative sympathy and the ending, where Bolton does not receive the recognition he has longed for throughout the night, is the more painful because it is clearly Henry’s loneliness."

The sad fact is that company is not the real answer. It is still only an anesthetic, numbing the pain. In the Beckettian universal construct sadly death rarely brings any relief either.

Whether Holloway is a real person or the character in the story even based on a real person is unclear.

==== Bolton = Henry’s father ====
An alternative stance is taken by Vivian Mercier who "suggests that Bolton is in fact Henry’s father" because of the use of "your" rather than "his" in the expression, "and the glim shaking in your old fist" assuming of course that Henry has returned to telling his tale to his dead father which seems most likely. Marjorie Perloff concurs with this reading.

This option offers a simpler explanation of the story. If it is based on his father's seeking some kind of escape from a life that has become unendurable, with a worthless son, a suicidal daughter and possibly an argumentative wife all symptoms of it, then Holloway could simply be a personification of any means of release. That the story is missing key elements is due to the fact that Henry himself does not have these pieces. As his life has dragged on in its own version of unendurability it is only obvious that he will start to relate more and more to the figure of Bolton. If, at this point, Henry were able to end his story, he would be "going beyond the confines of his own condition, of which his story is, in all essential aspects, a duplicate. The moment the story can be finished, there will be no one there to finish it'".

=== Ada ===
Henry's conversation with his wife at first "appears to take place in the present, but Ada does not really move into the scene and certain clues show that this dialogue actually took place years before when their marriage was only twenty years old and Addie was still a child." For one thing Beckett stipulates that she makes "[n]o sound as she sits." Also beforehand she was aware of "the least feather of smoke on the horizon" but now "she cannot see the beach where Henry is sitting ('is there anyone about?’) without his words to describe it."

The nature of their dialogue is odd too – quite civilized – considering the comment Henry made just before evoking her presence: "Ada too, conversation with her, that was something, that’s what hell will be like." Evidently he is remembering better times here. Katharine Worth conjectures that Ada represents a kind of muse, "a hint stressed in the sound of her voice – ‘low [and] remote throughout’ – and in the curious fact that she has been present in some mysterious way before he spoke her name." He calls on her because he needs her, his father does not answer and he is struggling with his story on his own.

Roger Blin, in an interview on 2 March 1975, in Paris, said: "Beckett absolutely didn't want me to try to do Embers for the theatre because, when you listen, you do not know if Ada exists or not, [or] whether she only exists in the imagination of the character Henry."

Ada is "immensely there", though, her personality is allowed to shine throughout her conversation with Henry; she does not merely respond, she initiates lines of thought, she nags him like a mother with her list of don’ts,? jokes with him, reproves him in a matter-of-fact way and refuses to mollycoddle him. She does not appear to take him very seriously either. Henry is obviously incapable of imagining her any other way than how she was when they were together, further evidence of his declining creative powers. Parts of their conversation, for example, sound as if they are simply reenactments of things said to each other when they were a couple but noticeably not all.

Her advice to Henry that he seeks medical assistance from Holloway, assuming him to be "a figure in the fiction he [has been] weaving", would add weight to the argument that Ada is both part imagined as well as part remembered.

Having performed her function to the best of her plainly limited abilities she leaves him to it with a down-to-earth, "Is this rubbish a help to you, Henry? … No? Then I think I’ll be getting back?"

== Conclusion ==
In a letter to Alan Schneider dated 6 September 1959, after finally hearing a tape of the BBC production, Beckett wrote: "Good performance and production but does not come off. My fault, text too difficult."
