= Rough for Theatre II =

- Written by: Samuel Beckett
- Characters: A (Bertrand); B (Morvan); C (Croker)
- Original language: French
- Setting: An apartment

Rough for Theatre II (also known simply as Theatre II) is a short play by Samuel Beckett. "Although this discarded piece of theatre is dated 'circa 1960' in End and Odds, a manuscript from two years earlier exists in Trinity College, Dublin, Library. This situates a first version, written in French [as Fragment de théâtre II] and different from that eventually published in 1976 as between the English plays Krapp's Last Tape and Embers." It is rarely produced.

== Synopsis ==
Two bureaucrats, Bertrand (A) and then Morvan (B) enter a sixth floor apartment where they find Croker (C) standing centre stage in front of an open window with his back to the audience, clearly on the point of throwing himself out of it. They are there to carry out a pro bono investigation into "the temperament, character and past life of this potential suicide."

A and B continue, in an almost comic fashion, with the desk lamps flickering on and off, and with a didactic analysis from B of the recounts he carries in his folder. In the end, the pair condemn Croker to jump. When A goes to the window to inspect Croker, however, he is surprised by something inexplicable that causes him to remove his handkerchief and bring it timidly to the would-be jumper's face. The ending is left open to various interpretations such as Croker may be crying, smiling, was dead prior to A and B's arrival or else died during the process.
