= Katharine Worth =

British academic (1922–2015)

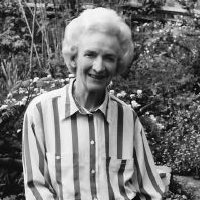
- Born: 4 August 1922; Newcastle upon Tyne, England
- Died: 28 January 2015 (aged 92); London, England
- Education: Bedford College, University of London
- Occupation: Academic
- Spouse: George Worth
- Children: 3

Katharine Worth (4 August 1922 – 28 January 2015) was a British academic, Professor of Drama at Royal Holloway, University of London.

== Biography ==
=== Early life and education ===
Katherine Joyce Worth (née Lorimer) was born in Newcastle upon Tyne, England, on 4 August 1922 to George and Elizabeth Lorimer. The family later moved to Newbiggin-by-the-Sea and Whitley Bay, Northumberland, where she grew up.

She was successful in obtaining a scholarship to Bedlington High School but left to sit the Civil Service entry exam when she was sixteen years old. She obtained a BA degree in English through a correspondence course with the University of London while employed as a junior civil servant. She went on to Bedford College, University of London, where she wrote a dissertation on George Bernard Shaw for her Master's in Research, followed by a doctoral thesis on American playwright and Nobel laureate Eugene O'Neill for her PhD, under the supervision of Una Ellis-Fermor, the College's then Hildred Carlile Professor of English.

=== Career ===
Worth initially lectured for the University of London department of Extra-Mural Studies and for the Central School of Speech and Drama. In 1964, she was appointed lecturer at Royal Holloway, becoming reader in 1974 and then professor in 1978. Worth set up a joint English and Drama degree at Royal Holloway in 1978, later introducing single honours Drama. On her appointment as the first professor of drama at the University of London she also became the first woman in England to hold this academic title. In her teaching, Worth was always committed to combining theory with theatre practice.

Worth was a distinguished expert on Modern theatre, especially Irish theatre, and a leading authority on Samuel Beckett. Worth published many essays and books on him – including Samuel Beckett’s Theatre: Life-Journeys. She also produced several productions of his plays: for example, working with actor Patrick Magee Worth produced Beckett's television play Eh Joe and his radio plays, Words and Music, Embers and Cascando. Beckett gave Worth special permission to work with these texts. Beckett also gave Worth permission to adapt his short story Company; the award-winning production of Worth's adaptation – directed by Tim Pigott-Smith and performed by Julian Curry at the Demarco Gallery Theatre 2–29 August 1987 – received a Fringe First at the Edinburgh Festival. It was later staged at the Belfast Festival (23–28 November 1987), the Donmar Warehouse in London (18 January – 6 February 1988, the Lehman College Center for the Performing Arts of the City University of New York (April 1988), the Princess Grace Theatre, Monaco (18 May 1991), and the 1991 Beckett Festival, Dublin. Worth also produced a double bill of Oscar Wilde's Salome and W. B. Yeats's Full Moon in March.

=== Retirement ===
Following her retirement, Worth spent a decade (1987–97) as co-editor of the Society for Theatre Research's Theatre Notebook, a journal of the history and technique of the British theatre; she also served as a visiting professor at King's College London for most of this period. In addition, she held a Leverhulme Professorial Fellowship (1987–89) and served on the advisory boards of the journals Yeats Annual and Modern Drama as well as those of many others.

In 2013, several rehearsal rooms and a new theatre named after Caryl Churchill were added to Sutherland House, the Regency villa that houses Royal Holloway's drama department. The new complex was named "The Katharine Worth Building" in Worth's honour.

On 8 May 2015, Worth's life was one of those celebrated on BBC Radio 4's obituary programme Last Word.

=== Personal life ===
In 1947, she married George Worth, with whom she had a daughter, Libby, and two sons, Christopher and Charles. She died of a viral infection on 28 January 2015, aged 92, survived by her children, George having predeceased her.

== Publications ==
- Katharine Worth (1973). Revolutions in Modern English Drama. G.Bell. ISBN 978-0713516661.
- Katharine Worth (1975). Beckett the Shape Changer. Routledge & Kegan Paul Books. ISBN 978-0710081230.
- Katharine Worth (1983). Oscar Wilde (Modern Dramatists). Macmillan. ISBN 978-0333304228.
- Katharine Worth (1985). Maeterlinck's Plays in Performance (Theatre in Focus). Chadwyck-Healey. ISBN 978-0859641555.
- Katharine Worth (1990). "Waiting for Godot" and "Happy Days" (Text & Performance). Palgrave Macmillan. ISBN 978-0333395783.
- Katharine Worth (1992). Sheridan and Goldsmith (English Dramatists). Palgrave Macmillan. ISBN 978-0333446119.
- Katharine Worth (2001). Samuel Beckett's Theatre: Life Journeys. OUP Oxford. ISBN 978-0198187790.
- Katharine Worth (2013). The Irish Drama of Europe from Yeats to Beckett (Bloomsbury Academic Collections: English Literary Criticism). Bloomsbury 3PL. ISBN 978-1472509697.

== See also ==
- Words and Music (play)
- Happy Days (play)
- ... but the clouds ...
- Play (play)
- Embers

== Selected bibliography ==
- Revolutions in Modern English Drama, 1973
- (ed.) Beckett the Shape Changer, 1975
- The Irish Drama of Europe: from Yeats to Beckett, 1978
- Oscar Wilde, 1983
- Maeterlinck’s Plays in Performance, 1985
- Waiting for Godot and Happy Days: text and performance, 1990
- Sheridan and Goldsmith, 1992
- Samuel Beckett’s Theatre: life journeys, 1999
- (ed.) Where There is Nothing by W. B Yeats and The Unicorn from the Stars by Yeats and Lady Gregory, 1987.
