= Ghost Trio (play) =

Television play written by Samuel Beckett

Ghost Trio is a television play, written in English by Samuel Beckett. It was written in 1975, taped in October 1976 and the first broadcast was on BBC2 on 17 April 1977 as part of The Lively Arts programme Beckett himself entitled Shades. Donald McWhinnie directed (supervised by Beckett) with Ronald Pickup and Billie Whitelaw. The play's original title was to be Tryst. "On Beckett’s notebook, the word was crossed out vigorously and the new title Ghost Trio written next to it. On the title page of the BBC script the same handwritten title change can be found, indicating that it must have been corrected at the very last minute."

It was first published in Journal of Beckett Studies 1 (Winter 1976) and then collected in Ends and Odds (Grove Press, 1976; Faber, 1977).

Its three 'acts' reflect Beethoven's Fifth Piano Trio (Opus 70, #1), known as The Ghost because of the slightly spooky mood of the second movement, Largo. The passages selected by Beckett are from the "ghostly" second theme.

Geistertrio, directed by Beckett was recorded by Süddeutscher Rundfunk, Stuttgart in May 1977 with Klaus Herm and Irmgard Först and broadcast 1 November 1977.

The idea for the piece dates back to 1968. At the time, whilst Beckett was working on the French translation of Watt, he had the first glimmerings of an idea for another television play. He discussed this with Josette Hayden who made the following note, which is probably all that remains of the original sketch:

A man is waiting, reading a newspaper, looking out of the window, etc., seen first at distance, then again in close-up, and the close-up forces a very intense kind of intimacy. His face, gestures, little sounds. Tired of waiting he ends up getting into bed. The close-up enters into the bed. No words or very few. Perhaps just a few murmurs.

== Synopsis ==
Beckett's stage layout is very precise. The setting yet another "familiar chamber", as the woman's voice puts it. In the text he includes a detailed diagram, a variation of which is reproduced aside.

Aside from the music, there are other trios at work here: there are three characters, the film is shot from three camera angles (which increase by three shots in each 'act') and the play is broken into three 'acts', each with a meaningful title.

=== Act I Pre-action ===
The opening image is a general view of the room, taken from camera position A. After the fade-up we hear a woman's voice addressing the audience directly:

"Good evening. Mine is a faint voice. Kindly tune accordingly. [Pause.] Good evening. Mine is a faint voice. Kindly tune accordingly. [Pause.] It will not be raised, nor lowered, whatever happens."

The woman describes the room: a window, a door, a pallet, which in the BBC production is scarcely more than a mattress on the floor. She neglects to mention the mirror or the stool but she takes time to emphasise that there is no obvious source of light, that everything is illuminated evenly and that everything in the room is grey. "The play’s lighting seems indeed to be supernatural." She apologises for stating what must seem obvious and then warns the viewer: "Keep that sound down."

The camera cuts to a close-up of the floor, a rectangle 0.7m x 1.5m. It is covered in dust. She tells us that having seen this sample we have effectively seen the whole floor. The exercise is repeated with a section of the wall. There then follow a number of close-ups, of the door, the window and the pallet from above, each a rectangular image although the dimensions vary slightly.

Now aware of the kind of pallet, the kind of window, door, wall and floor we are told to look again at the room as a whole. The camera switches to a general view (A) and moves slowly to position B.

There is a man (F - Figure) "seated on a stool, bowed forward, face hidden, clutching a small cassette" recorder, though, at this range, it's not possible to identify it as such until the camera moves to position C and we are presented with a close-up of the man who resembles a "slumping marionette". Beckett is very clear about how the camera sees the man:

"It [the camera] should not explore, simply look. It stops and stares. […] This staring vision essential to the piece."

The camera then recedes to A.

There are three instances of music in Act I: when we see each close-up of the door and as the camera moves forward to look at the man and then backwards to its starting position. "The appearance of the protagonist is thus linked to the entrance of the music with a pathos that strangely contradicts the cold scrutiny of the camera and the emotionally detached tone of the voice." The music does not emanate from the tape recorder however, it "exists outside human control, beyond words, outside time, space and the human dimension."

=== Act II Action ===
The bulk of Act II is filmed from position A. The woman's voice advises us, "He will now think he hears her," at which point F turns his head sharply towards the door. It is no one and he resumes his former pose. The next time he puts his cassette down, goes over to the door and listens. He opens it and checks but there is no one there, nor does he see anyone outside through the window. He drifts soundlessly "through space with no visible propulsion."

The man goes back over to his pallet, then changes his mind and looks at himself in the mirror. The voice is surprised at this. "Ah!" she says; her narration called for him to go to the door. If he can hear her at all, which seems unlikely, she clearly is not in control of him. When he is done the man retrieves his cassette and takes up his opening position. The camera then repeats what it did at the end of Act I, it moves forward from position A to B and then to C where we get a close-up of the man. The camera then retreats as before.

Figure then gets up, goes back to the door and looks out once more. After ten seconds he lets it go and it closes slowly of itself. He goes back to the stool, irresolute.

The voice instructs the music to stop, which it does. After a brief pause she says, "Repeat."

There are two instances of music this time, during the camera's repeat of its Act I movements (a recapitulation of the previous theme) and also when he opens the door the second time (which introduces the second subject of the movement).

=== Act III Re-action ===
Immediately after Voice asks for a repeat the camera cuts to a close-up of Figure. The music is audible. It moves in closer. The music gets slightly louder and then stops. She does not speak for the rest of the play. "Act III is embedded in Act II … this time as a mime, without narration but with the camera adopting Figure’s point of view on occasion."

Again, the man thinks he hears someone and goes to the door. This time we get to see down the corridor; predictably it is empty, grey and ends in darkness. When he goes to the window we get to see outside this time; it is night, rain is falling in the dim light. The camera returns to the pallet and to the mirror which is a small grey rectangle, the same dimensions as the cassette. There is nothing reflected in the mirror at first. When the camera returns we see the man in it. He closes his eyes, opens them and then bows his head. Each of the inspections is interspersed with a God-like view from above.

He returns to his opening position. The music stops and the sound of approaching footsteps is heard. They stop and there is a faint knock on the door. After a pause, another, this time louder. When he opens the door there is a small boy dressed in a black oilskin. The boy shakes his head faintly, pauses, shakes his head again, turns and leaves. In Beckett's production of the play for German television, the boy does not wear oilskins, nor does he turn to go, but backs slowly away down the corridor. Beckett made the same change to his 1976 Schiller Theatre production of Waiting for Godot, having the messenger leave the stage backwards.

Figure stands there cradling the cassette in his arms. The camera backs off and the scene fades out. A significant addition Beckett made to the film was to have "Figure raise his head, stare into the camera and offer a slight, enigmatic smile", changing the tone completely from the printed texts, which, like Film, have never been updated. It recalls an earlier play, That Time, where Listener's final smile results from his release from the three narrating voices, endlessly recounting his past. It certainly suggests that the child's negative message held some positive implications for him.

There are three further instances of music here: at the opening, when Figure sits just before the boy's footsteps are heard and after the boys have left and the man is standing there alone.

== The music ==
There are seven excerpts from Beethoven's Piano Trio heard in the play. Beckett indicates precisely where they come in according to the camera movements:

- I.13; beginning bar 47: faint music, for five seconds, the recapitulation of the second motif of the opening subject, the ghostly haunting theme. Music linked to the camera's focus upon the door.
- I.23; beginning bar 49: "a more dissonant and highly charged version of the motif, with the main rising interval or the melodic line being greater, thus producing greater tension." Again the music is linked to the door.
- I.31; beginning bar 19: as at I.13, but with piano accompaniment, with crescendo, increasing harmonic tension, rising pitch, and a stretto effect as motifs overlap.

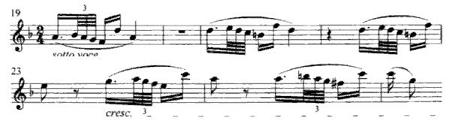
Beethoven's Piano Trio Opus 70, No 1, 2nd movement, bars 19–25, violin

- II.26-29; beginning bar 64: a parallel passage, a recapitulation of that used in I.31-34, but with the stretto effect beginning earlier, and so greater tension
- II.35,36; beginning bar 71: like the previous passage, but with the "ghostly" theme overlapping itself, with more movement on the piano part.
- III.1,2,4,5; beginning bar 26: again a recapitulation, the equivalent passage to bar 71; marginally more restful since the rising intervals are all octaves.
- III.29; beginning bar 64: the same music as II.26, but this time the footsteps are heard and the boy appears.
- III.36; beginning bar 82: the music grows as the camera moves in; this is the coda, the end of the movement.

== Interpretation ==
In a letter dating from January 1976, Beckett wrote of a first draft of a television play in which all of the motifs from his œuvre had returned: "All the old ghosts. Godot and Eh Joe over infinity. Only remains to bring it to life." Biographer James Knowlson observes that on "the first typescript of 'Tryst', Beckett wrote in by hand the word 'Macbeth'. When I asked him directly what he meant by this note, he explained that the record sleeve of his own recording (the version made by Daniel Barenboim) linked this Piano Trio with Beethoven’s music for an opera based on Macbeth [...] 'The Ghost' retained for Beckett something of Macbeth’s doom laden atmosphere and involvement in the spirit world."

"Krapp's Last Tape and Ghost Trio," observes Graley Herren, "are not customarily thought of together; at first sight, the two plays do indeed appear to be quite different. Yet, on closer look, it is perhaps more puzzling why the two are not considered more alike. Both focus upon a man alone in his room thinking about a long lost other. Both men are prompted into deeper meditation by audio-recordings. Both are occasionally distracted away from their respective tapes, which stop and start several times. But each man eventually returns to his intent pose, crouching protectively, even lovingly, over the indispensable instrument of his reverie."

There are many other motifs within the play that recall other works, none less than the appearance of the boy who may be saying, similar to the boys in Godot, "'She' will not come today, but surely tomorrow."

On the surface the boy could simply be a go-between but, with the changes Beckett made – removing the oilskin and having the boy back away – it would appear that Beckett is looking to add significance to his small role. "It is almost as though the boy were F’s youth, coming to tell him he has not yet reached the end of his course and backing away into his past." This interpretation is given weight by James Knowlson who suggests that "the man [is] perhaps about to die;" it may be that all he has been waiting on is the news that his beloved is not coming so he can let go. Perhaps this is what is intimated by the added smile. It has been noted too that, in the BBC version, the corridor surrounding the boy "resembles a coffin."

Is the awaited one a departed lover, reluctant muse or death herself? Does the voice we hear belong to her? Presumably, she is deceased. It has even been suggested that the boy is "the ghost of the perhaps-unborn child" of the man's relationship with the woman. The specifics are unclear but the mood is.

As with the radio play Words and Music, the role of Beethoven's music in this piece is to reflect the emotions of Figure and "his yearning for 'her'. His thoughts persistently return to the Largo and the intensity of his feeling is expressed by the music's increases in volume. In a sense 'she' is the music. It expresses her presence in Figure's consciousness in much the same way as Croak urged both Words and Music to express his memory of 'the face on the stairs.'"

Opinions differ greatly over the work and most critics tend to concentrate on descriptions rather than meanings, in fact, Beckett's biographer and long-time friend, James Knowlson, goes as far as to admit that "no significant meaning can be abstracted" from the piece. At the same time it has also been called, "one of Beckett’s miniature masterpieces."

=== On the Marionette Theatre ===
Puppets have been a source of interest to Beckett going back as far as the story, Love and Lethe, however, the most famous quote is from Murphy: "all the puppets in this book whinge sooner or later, except Murphy, who is not a puppet."

Beckett had been very impressed by Heinrich von Kleist's 1810 essay, Über das Marionettentheatre (On the Marionette Theatre) and his admiration was evidenced when he was rehearsing with Ronald Pickup for the BBC recording of Ghost Trio. Kleist envisioned the marionette as sublime, transcending not only the limits and flaws of the human body, but of the weight of self-consciousness. Self-awareness, he maintained, bred affectation, which destroys natural grace and charm in man. "Man is, therefore, a creature permanently off balance. He lacks the unity, harmony, symmetry and grace that characterizes the puppet."

"In Ghost Trio … the male figure (F) acts as if he were virtually a puppet, turning his head sharply whenever he thinks 'he hears her' and moving around the room, as if he were being controlled by the woman's voice, which issues what are, ambiguously, either commands or, more likely, anticipations of actions. The movements of his hand, as he pushes open the door or the window, and the movements of his head, as he bows it in front of the mirror, are all slow, deliberate, highly economical, and extremely graceful." Beckett's aim "was to achieve a musicality of gesture as striking as that of voice." His argument was "that precision and economy would produce the maximum of grace." and it was this aspect of Kleist's argument Beckett was using as the basis of his drama.

The figure in the room is somewhere betwixt marionette and man, however, "one sustained, economical and flowing, the other abrupt and jerky … poised midway between two worlds … in spite of everything, a creature bound to a world of matter, not quite the still-life figure that at moments he appears to be. Nor is he totally free of self-consciousness, as his look in the mirror indicates, or wholly indifferent to the world of the non-self."
