= Catastrophe (play) =

1982 play by Samuel Beckett

Catastrophe is a short play by Samuel Beckett, written in French in 1982 at the invitation of A.I.D.A. (Association Internationale de Défense des Artistes) and “[f]irst produced in the Avignon Festival (21 July 1982) … Beckett considered it ‘massacred.’” It is one of his few plays to deal with a political theme and, arguably, holds the title of Beckett's most optimistic work. Beckett "wrote the short play Catastrophe about control and censorship" and dedicated it to the Czech dramatist Václav Havel, who was in prison at the time. Havel wrote a play called Mistake "as a response to the one Beckett had written in solidarity." "In February 1984, in one of the most significant milestones in the history of Index on Censorship, both plays were published for the first time." In January 2022, after almost 38 years, in 50th birthday celebration of Index, they asked "Iranian playwright Reza Shirmarz to write his own response to Beckett's Catastrophe." Shirmarz wrote his play Muzzled which was published by Index as a dramatic response to Beckett's Catastrophe. Giving his viewpoints on Beckett's play in an interview with Index, Shirmarz said that "Catastrophe is about censored communication, the ritualistic representation and the symbolic image of human relationship constrained by external forces, a deterministic, political and post-dramatic text which demonstrates how humans are coerced to be and live in a torturous limbo. [In Catastrophe], Beckett's Protagonist is deprived of free will by the systems surrounding him and the systematic control imposed by others, except at the moment he moves his head up and looks at the spectators. Despite his psychosomatic pain, he talks through his silence and protests through his immobility. As so-called social factors and audiences, we are reminded by the playwright that we are not able to get out of the cage the sociopolitical conventions have imprisoned us in and we must abide by the unbreachable laws brought in by the global structures and conglomerates in order to survive." Beckett's Catastrophe and Havel's Mistake directed by Michael Brown and Shirmarz's Muzzled by Sami Ismat were produced as a part of Festival of Absurd Theatre at The Chopin Theatre in Chicago in my 2025.

== Synopsis ==
An autocratic Director and his female Assistant put the “‘[f]inal touches to the last scene’ of some kind of dramatic presentation”, which consists entirely of a man (The Protagonist) standing still onstage.

The Assistant has arranged the man as she has seen fit to, atop a “black block 18” high”, draped in a “black dressing gown [down] to [his] ankles” and – peculiarly – sporting a “black wide-brimmed hat.” The bulk of the drama consists of the Director wresting control from her and moulding the man on stage to suit his personal vision. “The Director call for light, both for his cigar which is constantly going out and for the spectacle of the Protagonist on stage.”

The Director is an irritable and impatient man, his annoyance likely exacerbated by the fact that he has another appointment, “a caucus”, to attend and his time there is limited. He expresses concern with the overall appearance and demands that the coat and hat be removed leaving the man “shivering” in his “old grey pyjamas.” He has the man's fists unclenched and then joined, the only suggestion of his Assistant's that he pays any heed to; once arranged at breast-height he is satisfied. (Beckett explained to James Knowlson that when he was composing Catastrophe, “In my mind was Dupuytren’s contracture (from which I suffer) which reduces hands to claws.”) The Director dismisses his Assistant's proposal to have the man gagged ("This craze for explicitation!") or to “show his face … just for an instant.” He also has her make notes to whiten all the exposed flesh.

In a moment of respite, when the Director leaves the stage, his Assistant collapses into his chair then springs out and wipes it vigorously, as if to avoid contamination, before reseating herself. This helps the audience appreciate better her relationship to each of the parties. She is after all the one who dressed the Protagonist warmly and who – twice – highlights the fact that he is shivering. In some ways she is just “another victim rather than a collaborator.”

Finally they rehearse lighting with the theatre technician (the never-seen "Luke"). The play-within-a-play lasts only a few seconds: from darkness, to light falling on the man's head and then darkness again. Finally the Director exclaims: "There's our catastrophe! In the bag" and asks for one last run through before he has to leave. He imagines the rising of the expectant applause on the opening day (“Terrific! He’ll have them on their feet. I can hear it from here"). The man has become, as John Calder puts it, “a living statue portraying, from the director’s point of view, the quiescent, unprotesting victim, a symbol of the ideal citizen of a totalitarian regime.”

However, in an act of defiance, the man looks up into the audience (after having been looking down the entire time); the “applause falters and dies.” A Pyrrhic victory perhaps. However “the figure’s unexpected movement seems to happen not in the director’s imagined timespace but in the timespace of [actual] performance. The moment is unsettling … We do not know why the figure has reacted like this; we do not know when the reaction happens; we do not know where the reaction takes place.” Beckett told Mel Gussow that “it was not his intention to have the character make an appeal … He is a triumphant martyr rather than a sacrificial victim … and it is meant to cow onlookers into submission through the intensity of his gaze and stoicism.”

== Interpretations ==
The title requires some clarification. “In the words of Aristotle: ‘catastrophe is an action bringing ruin and pain on stage, [where] wounds and other similar sufferings are performed,’”. Malone refers to “Catastrophe … in the old sense … [t]o be buried alive in lava and not turn a hair, it is then a man shows what stuff he is made of.” The more obvious definition applies of course to the act of defiance itself; the effect is nothing less than catastrophic.

The play is often singled out amongst the Beckett canon as being overtly political even though similar claims could be made for What Where and Rough for Radio II. The play is still a Beckett play and as such it is unwise to limit ones reading of it. "When ... asked about the political significance of Catastrophe, he raised his arms in a gesture of impatience and made just one remark: 'It is not more political than Pochade Radiophonique’”, Rough for Radio II, as the latter is known in English."

=== Political ===
The play can be viewed as an allegory on the power of totalitarianism and the struggle to oppose it, the protagonist representing people ruled by dictators (the director and his aide). By "tweak[ing] him until his clothing and posture project the required image of pitiful dejectedness", they exert their control over the silenced figure. “The Director’s reifying of the Protagonist can be seen as an attempt to reduce a living human being to the status of an icon of impotent suffering. But, at the end of the play, he reasserts his humanity and his individuality in a single, vestigial, yet compelling movement.” In answer to a reviewer who claimed that the ending was ambiguous Beckett replied angrily: “There’s no ambiguity there at all. He’s saying, you bastards, you haven’t finished me yet.”

=== Theatrical ===
A filmed version of Catastrophe was directed by David Mamet for the Beckett on Film project. It starred playwright and Beckett enthusiast Harold Pinter as the Director, and featured the last on-camera appearance of the British actor, John Gielgud as the Protagonist (he died only a few weeks later).

This version has been somewhat controversial, as Mamet chose to film it as a realist piece: the scene takes place in an actual theatre, and the principals are dressed as a director and his assistant might look. “When the director (D) made his peremptory demands for light from his female assistant (A) he received it not for his cigar, as in the original, but in the form of torchlight for his script. This weakened the sense of gratuitous offensiveness hanging about the character. D., played by Pinter, received rather too much camera attention and a patient John Gielgud rather too little, above all at the final moment” when he raises his head in defiance. Some critics have argued that this interpretation takes away from the tyrannical theme of the play. Mamet also changes Beckett's stage direction concerning the Protagonist's hands, substituting a finger pointing for the hands joined.

This is not the only version that has taken liberties with the staging. “When Catastrophe was performed in the Beckett Festival on 15 September 1999, the director Robert O’Mahoney, interpreted the climax very differently [from the way Beckett had]. After Johnny Murphy raised his head and glared with great dignity at the audience, his lips parted and stretched into an imitation of Edvard Munch’s The Scream. This nullified the impact of the ending, as Protagonist was reduced to nothing more than an abject silently screaming victim.”

Catastrophe is not only about a political situation and the place of the artist in it. The victim or “protagonist” is also representative of all actors, having to portray what writers write for them in the way directors tell them to do it (Beckett is not unaware of his own relationship with actors, particularly those who in the past have resisted his stage directions). The director in the play catches two prototypes, that of the political commissar and of the all-powerful personality director like Peter Brook, Vitez, [Mamet or O’Mahoney], who bend a performance to their own interpretation, where often the victim is the author himself; there are many “in” theatrical jokes. The director's assistant coolly carries out her instructions, and it matters little if we are in a concentration camp or a film studio: all humane considerations are ruled out to achieve the ultimate work of art. The two-pronged metaphor is incredibly effective for all its surface simplicity. In time, as with all of Beckett's work, more strands and allusions will be discovered.

=== Personal ===
“The play has also been related to Beckett’s own horror at self-exposure, and linked to the essentially exhibitionist nature of theatre. It has been seen as demonstrating the impossibility for an artist to shape his work in such a way that it reveals what he intends it to reveal; art in the end escapes him.”
