= Rough for Radio II =

Play written by Samuel Beckett

Rough for Radio II is a radio play by Samuel Beckett. It was written in French in 1961 as Pochade radiophonique and published in Minuit 16, November 1975. Beckett translated the work into English shortly before its broadcast on BBC Radio 3 on 13 April 1976. Martin Esslin directed Harold Pinter (Animator), Billie Whitelaw (Stenographer) and Patrick Magee (Fox). The English-language version was first published in Ends and Odds (Grove, 1976, Faber, 1977) as Radio II.

Esslin said that Beckett "regard[ed] the work as unfinished, no more than a rough sketch, and felt, having heard the production that it had 'not come off'." Beckett "put the blame on the script but he told Esslin that 'the production which made the Animator and his team start briskly and become more weary and discouraged as time went on should already have started on a high degree of weariness and despair.'"

== Synopsis ==
A man, who we discover has the title “Animator” makes small talk with his young female stenographer: is she ready to get to work, does she have the tools of her trade? The interchange is light and familiar. He then consults a character called Dick; is he on his toes? The man, a mute, doesn’t answer other than to make a swishing noise to which the Animator exclaims, “Wow! Let’s hear it land.” Dick strikes the desk with, what the text refers to as, a “bull’s pizzle”, a whip made from a bull's penis. (‘Dick’ is, of course, a euphemism for penis). It is certainly humorous, though hardly revolutionary, to use a character that is unable to speak in a radio play. What is of interest is that it is his job to encourage Fox to speak.

Dick is instructed to remove a hood from a fourth figure, Fox, followed by his gag, blindfold and earplugs. The man is kept bound though. As his eyes adjust to the light he recognises “the same old team” – evidently this is not then the first time he has been interrogated. Unexpectedly he smiles at the woman and this startles her, which prompts a coarse remark from the Animator: “What is it, miss? Vermin in the lingerie?” This is not the first time he has smiled; she checks to see if it should be recorded but is told not to.

The Stenographer proceeds to read her report on the results from day before but the Animator has her skip practically all of it apart from the first three “exhortations”. Item #3 expresses particular concern regarding the condition and use of the Fox's gag. It is imperative he make no utterance that cannot be recorded and scrutinized in case what he says “may be it”. “But no word, says Mauthner, can have such transcendent power; however tortured, words cannot reveal truth.”

She is stopped just after this and goes on to read Fox's closing remarks from the day before which refer to him washing and drying a mole in front of a fire before returning the creature to its “chamber with his weight of grubs.” From the expression, “in that instant his little heart was beating still” it could be construed that the mole was actually dead, perhaps killed by accident when he was a child but more likely frozen to death in the blizzard he has to endure to return it to the ground.

The Animator wants to know if the glare bothers her. The woman says not and adds that heat doesn’t trouble her either but still asks permission to remove her overall. This – predictably – prompts comment from the Auditor: “Staggering! Ah were I but … forty years younger”, another inappropriate remark underlining his lascivious nature. The text does not comment on what she is – or is not – wearing underneath but Billie Whitelaw's observation in a Radio Times interview is revealing: “I felt that the girl I play, the stenographer, starts out in uniform and ends with nothing on.” Her response is to reread the end of Fox's last testimony: “Ah my God my God [Blow with pencil] My God,” words that remind one of someone's cries while in a state of sexual ecstasy but presented in the least erotic of tones. Having worked with him before she is doubtless well aware of the nature of the man she is dealing with – someone who could undress her with his eyes no matter what she was wearing – and his hidden agenda. Her response annoys him. He calls her a “Crabbed youth,” before proceeding.

She recommends “a touch of kindness” be applied to Fox, “perhaps just a hint.” The Animator says he appreciates the sentiment but is obdurate: they stick with his method (despite its obvious lack of results).

After further prompting by Dick, Fox begins his second monologue describing a life underground (perhaps the mole's he spoke of before), “living dead in the stones.” He fades away but, when threatened with the whip again, moves onto his third outpouring, where he mentions a brother – the first family member he has spoken of – his twin, actually inside himself and hungry. Someone named “Maud” – the only person he has ever mentioned by name – has proposed a Caesarean section volunteering to nurse the twin when born. At this point Fox breaks down and starts weeping. The Animator remains undecided as to whether this should be recorded. Up until this point he has been adamant that only Fox's words are relevant.

A final stroke of Dick's pizzle brings only one line. Fox – or more likely the mole/twin – cries out: “Let me out! Peter out in the stones!”

In a change of tactic, the Animator quietly tries to make clear to Fox what he really wants: “More variety! … [A]stonish me.”, He even hints to him that he might try being creative with the truth, the very notion of which shocks the Stenographer. It may seem at first look that the bound protagonist is the captive, but by this stage of the play, the audience is beginning to realise that the Stenographer and Animator are the ones who are truly captive. They hang upon every word Fox emits. The Animator even confesses that he doesn’t know precisely what he is looking for other than he’ll know it when he hears it, unlike Bam in What Where who is after specific details. It is becoming clearer that the Animator is seeking something in Fox that most likely isn’t there.

Since physical violence hasn’t proved successful, nor has gentle persuasion, the Animator modifies his approach once more: “Dick! – no, wait. Kiss him, miss, perhaps that will stir some fibre … on his stinker of a mouth … Till it bleeds! Kiss it white!” Fox howls and faints.

Since nothing more is to be gotten from Fox the two review the evidence, the tear – he had shed a number the previous winter – and Maud's willingness to act as a wet nurse. The Stenographer highlights the point that, for Maud to be able to produce milk pointed to the fact she is likely already pregnant. The Animator drools over the image of a milk-engorged breast: “One can almost see it!”

The woman wonders out loud who might be the father. This finally fires Animator's imagination: “May we have that passage again, miss?” She reads it verbatim but he objects insisting she is omitting the phrase, “between two kisses.” She tries to stand her ground but he gets angry and demands she amend her notes accordingly effectively “insert[ing] the Stenographer (and her kissing of Fox) into Fox’s discourse.” (This is in violation of Item #2 of the “exhortations”). She acquiesces and timidly reads back the text. Finally, something to appeal to his crude tastes.

He is now satisfied and is hopeful that by the next day their work may very well be done. “Don’t cry, miss, dry your pretty eyes and smile at me. Tomorrow, who knows, we may be free.” This reminds us of the ending of Radio I: “Tomorrow … noon.” Everything will be better tomorrow. Beckett brings many of his characters to this brink (e.g. Clov at the end of Endgame) but for these trapped souls the future only turns out to be an endless succession of today's.

== Interpretation ==
Scholars have demonstrated a fondness for grouping Beckett's works according to perceived themes: memory plays, political plays, ghost plays and so on. Rough for Radio II can easily sustain a political interpretation (one wonders how much it influenced Pinter's own One for the Road, for example) but alternative readings can also be made of the other so-called ‘political’ plays. These plays, Catastrophe and What Where can also be grouped along with Rough for Theatre II and Rough for Radio II as ‘procedural’ plays.

Whereas many of Beckett's work have a circular aspect, these four plays all have a linear core; each can be, or is, stopped when certain conditions are met. In the case of Catastrophe, when the living statue meets the director's aesthetic criteria; in What Where, when one of the interrogators extracts the required information; in Rough for Theatre II, when a decision is made as to Croker's future and in Rough for Radio II, if an unknown sign or set of words is provided by Fox. Each play has its own process, procedures that have to be followed. All evoke bureaucracy even though in What Where there is no physical paperwork per se.

Robert Sandarg has put forward this short possible synopsis of the play:

“Rough for Radio II may concern a critic torturing an author. The Animator speaks of Sterne and Dante, ‘old spectres from the days of book reviewing’, and the twin which Fox carries monstrously within himself could be his book.”

As regards a ‘true’ interpretation a good starting point is Martin Esslin's comment that the play is “about the artistic process” itself which Beckett by no means found easy; his output is respectable but he was not exactly prolific. “There are two moments worthwhile in writing,” he summed up to a friend, “the one where you start and the other where you throw it in the waste-paper basket.”

The play interestingly reverses the act of creation of a radio play: “instead of the sequence {text → speech → electromagnetic vibration}, we have the sequence {twitch of whip → speech → text} –first the slap of the bull’s pizzle on flesh, then Fox’s words, then the stenographer’s transcript.” To produce this article, this author – and by extension those authors quoted – first tuned into a radio broadcast (or put on a recording of one), listened to the words and then converted his understanding of them into text.

=== Fox ===
"Which is more painful," I asked him, "writing or not writing?"
"They're both painful, but the pain is different."

An old adage says that people hear what they want to hear; they home in on what's relevant to them. Animator is not really listening to Fox any more than a great number of Beckett's audiences over the years haven’t listened to him: Godot sounds like God so he must be God, mustn’t he?

Fox sounds like ‘vox’, the Latin word for ‘voice’, but in this case it is not unreasonable to assume this is intentional on Beckett's part considering his only requirement is to give voice to that certain something that will satisfy his interrogator. In the French original, the interrogatee is still named ‘Fox’ rather than ‘Renard’ perhaps because Beckett wanted his audience to make the Fox/Vox connection first. The French for ‘voice’ is ‘voix’.

“Fox’s stream of words presents a series of puzzling images. Should the listener simply consider each of these – the soaping of the mole, his drying by the embers, the mention of a parasitic twin brother growing within him, a mother figure named Maud – as pictograms, which escape interpretation? Fox only speaks under duress. Does he represent the artist figure, forced by habit or vocation to express himself in a series of ever-repeating motifs despite not having a specific purpose or subject? Whether or not he has something revelatory to communicate … he lives up to his name by not divulging it. As a result, his silence gives him power over his captors and even his torturer, Dick.”

Symbols are the method that the unconscious uses to communicate important information and guidance to the conscious mind. Fox's speech from the day before talks about returning a dead mole to his womblike chamber (with food to last it), an image centred on insertion; the first of the new day concentrates on the mole (now miraculously alive – “Live I did…) moving through tunnels seeking the way out (in fact the text shifts to a first-person narrative) whereas the final section focuses on Fox’s awareness of his twin’s hunger driving his desperate need for extraction. “Taken together, Fox’s three utterances can be seen to construct a scenario of a self-birth attempted yet blocked.” Maud says he needs to be “opened up”; as he can’t ‘open up’ himself, someone needs to step into that rôle. In Cascando (1962/63) this is what the controller is called, the “Opener”, after his function. His use of the term “passage” to refer to something Fox has said before emphasises that what we are hearing is the “scrabble, scrabble” of his “old twin” trying to find a way out. This culminates in the final cry: “Let me out!”

If Fox embodies the source of raw data available to the creative process, personified by the Animator and his team, what does Fox's twin represent? Most likely his deepest, darkest memories, memories that he has repressed (or at least suppressed). Aware that it may be these that the Animator is trying to reach Fox exercises his power over him by refusing to release them to him (“ah but no, no no”); they look as if they may ‘die’ inside him.

The metaphorical image of an author giving birth to a work of fiction is not new, nor is the picture of the “tortured artist”, nor even the assertion that all fiction is thinly veiled biography; in Beckett's case there are biographical elements embedded throughout all his work and if a writer's task is to get something out of himself onto the page, that something, that part of himself, could quite poetically be referred to as the twin inside him.

"Influential psychoanalysts Didier Anzieu and Bennett Simon as well as a number of Beckett critics hold that Wilfred Bion's 1950 paper on The Imaginary Twin is part of a fictionalised account of his treatment of Beckett some fifteen years earlier … The suspicion that the young Beckett is patient A of The Imaginary Twin is supported by Bion's description of his inventive analysand as a man who was adept at blurring the boundary between real and imaginary events, who made ambiguous statements that were open to multiple interpretations, who felt that he was inhabited by an unborn twin and imagined himself in a womb afraid to be born.” "The notion that Fox articulates – the me inside an I that can never be merged with the I – becomes the most dominant motif in Beckett’s [later] writing.

“A fox is a crafty, reclusive creature, and Fox seems devoted to producing speech that dances away from any sort of devastating apprehension of meaning. On the other hand, Fox, as a 'fodient rodent', does seem to be trying to burrow towards some deep truth. He is remarkable interested in tunnels; not only does he soap a mole, but he also says at one point that he is taking to the tunnels, and the foetal or ghost twin that Fox conceals in his belly is also suggestive of his preoccupation with the interior of things ... As a tireless explorer in the labyrinth of language, as an old mole trying to convey difficult insight to the public, Fox may indeed be speaking words worth scanning for hidden meaning.”

Fox speaks of tunnelling for his goal, ‘age upon age, up again, down again, little lichens of my little span, living dead in the stones’. The artist (or creator) as excavator or burrower is another Beckettian leitmotif. In Proust he speaks of ‘the labours of poetical excavation’ and states that ‘the only fertile research is excavatory, immersive, a contraction of the spirit, a descent’. He told the actress Elisabeth Bergner that he was ‘not looking for answers: I am only trying to dig a little deeper’; and he spoke to Lawrence E. Harvey ‘of the attempt to find [the] lost self in images of getting down, getting below the surface, concentrating, listening, getting your ear down so you can hear the infinitesimal murmur. There is a grey struggle, a groping in the dark for a shadow’. The decisive comment comes in The Unnamable: ‘Are there other pits, deeper down? To which one accedes by mine? Stupid obsession with depth’

In "Rough for Radio II, Beckett represents the process of his own creativity as writer by an 'animator' and his secretary who takes down the utterances of a little man, who is usually gagged and blindfolded, but taken out each day and asked to speak ... [T]he monologue he utters, which is a stream of consciousness that forms the material of the writer, must be taken down according to strict rules." But the Animator breaks these rules and incorporates an idea of his own into the text. This represents the "slippage between what the artist wants to express and what he is capable of expressing. As Beckett says of Bram van Velde in the three dialogues, he was 'the first to admit that to be an artist is to fail.'" Bearing this in mind the oft quoted lines from Worstward Ho take on a greater significance: "Ever tried. Ever failed. No matter. Try again. Fail again. Fail better."

=== Animator ===
“The healthy man does not torture others - generally it is the tortured who turn into torturers.” - Carl Jung (Return to the Simple Life, 1941)

Beckett's interest in all kinds of psychoanalytical writing is well documented. And so, when one sees a name like Anima-tor, an obvious question to ask is: is this character a personification of the character's anima? If that is the case then what we have in Rough for Radio II, like Rough for Radio I, is another of Beckett's “mindscapes”.

Jung viewed the anima process as being one of the sources of creative ability (which would make Fox the wellspring of ideas, experiences and dreams). “A complex consists of two parts; an archetypal core … (Animator) … surrounded by a cluster or shell of images, memories, and feelings … (Fox) … that are the result of childhood experiences with human beings. It is as if the archetypal core acts like a magnet, around which events cluster that belong to that archetype. This core adds energy to the complex.”

The Animator is a sensualist who imposes his grossness on his victims, Fox, an intuitive creature who lives by his senses and also his unfortunate female assistant. There is no doubt that Beckett had a sexual side to his nature though – understandably – little is on record as to how this aspect of him affected his work. His writing, although not primarily sexual, never shies away from it but one could never refer to it as ‘titillating’. That sexual urges might have distracted him from his writing is always a possibility. Anthony Cronin, in his biography, talks about the year when Beckett was struggling to complete Murphy . Some days he would go for long walks “from nine or ten in the morning until six or seven in the evening, scarcely seeing a soul. Telling MacGreevy about this, he said it saved masturbation.”

“The anima … holds in it an expression of a man's complex of feelings about women, gained as experience mostly from his mother – or lack of mother – but also from a synthesis of all his female contacts … A negative side to the anima that is “that of the woman/mother who poisons everything, whose … critical remarks hurt and constantly demean. This may live on in a man as self-criticism. A slight twist on this is the man who considers himself an intellectual, but actually is possessed by an anima that does not allow real creative thought, but expresses opinions and fears as clever words (“Have you read the Purgatory, miss, of the divine Florentine?”) or arguments (“What the devil are you deriding, miss? My hearing? My memory? My good faith?”). This enables the person to feel [they are] always right, and actually avoid any real meeting with other people or life experience. Strangely, such men are often driven to pornography, in a desperate drive to meet denied personal needs.”

Beckett stipulates that the Animator has a “cylindrical ruler”, clearly a phallic image. Dick is in no way a fully-fledged character in his own right, rather an extension of the Animator, a penis substitute (admittedly a Freudian term). The Stenographer only has a small pencil showing her place in the pecking order. (Although represented by a female she is nevertheless an aspect of a male character). There is a subtext of impotence however. The Animator is trying to get something from Fox that's not there; he tries to read into it and, eventually, has to ‘spice up’ the text himself. “In the end it comes down to a question of bending the truth to get relief.”

Ultimately the creative process has not been faithful to the truth but does it have to be? More than most writers, Beckett plumbed the depths of his own life for source material. Some sections are transparently biographical (e.g. the scene in Krapp’s Last Tape where Krapp's mother dies) but exactly how faithful to the truth only Beckett himself would know. But it is a work of fiction, not a psychological treatise and certainly not biography in the strictest sense; the facts are bent to fit the truth of the play.
