= Dialogue in writing =

Dialogue in fictional compositions

Dialogue, in literature, is conversation between two or more characters. If there is only one character talking, it is a monologue. Dialogue plays a role in making characters in literature more believable to the reader, by allowing them to voice their internal thoughts.

== Usage ==
In their book Writing Fiction, Janet Burroway, Elizabeth Stuckey-French and Ned Stuckey-French say dialogue is a direct basic method of character presentation, which plays an essential role in bringing characters to life by voicing their internal thoughts. When significant or dramatic events are happening, dialogue can be written in direct quotation. Otherwise, speech can either be summarized as part of the narrative or written as indirect speech which is useful to get to the core of a scene.

In The Craft of Writing (1979), American writer of fantasy and science fiction William Sloane wrote:

There is a tentative rule that pertains to all fiction dialogue. It must do more than one thing at a time or it is too inert for the purposes of fiction.

In The Craft of Fiction (1921), British essayist Percy Lubbock (1879–1965) wrote:

The novelist may give the very words that were spoken by his characters, the dialogue, but of course he must interpose on his own account to let us know how the people appeared, and where they were, and what they were doing. If he offers nothing but the bare dialogue, he is writing a kind of play; just as a dramatist, amplifying his play with 'stage-directions' and putting it forth to be read in a book, has really written a kind of novel.

== Method of writing ==
Dialogue is usually identified by the use of quotation marks and a dialogue tag, such as 'she said'.

"This breakfast is making me sick," George said.

'George said' is the dialogue tag, which is also known as an identifier, an attributive, a speaker attribution, a speech attribution, a dialogue tag, and a tag line. Stephen King, in his book On Writing, asserted that said is the best dialogue tag to use. King recommended reading a novel by Larry McMurtry, who he said had mastered the art of well-written dialogue.

Dialogue tags other than said, such as murmured, whimpered or thundered, are known as 'said-bookisms', and are considered to detract from the narrative if over-used. Journalist Cory Doctorow says said-bookisms lead to "writerly laziness" because it is easier to use dialogue tags to tell the reader how the character is speaking than have the dialogue itself convey this, and it thus weakens the story.

== Example ==
The following excerpt from chapter two of the novel Bleak House by Charles Dickens shows dialogue between three characters.

"My Lady's cause has been again before the Chancellor, has it, Mr. Tulkinghorn?" says Sir Leicester, giving him his hand.

"Yes. It has been on again to-day," Mr. Tulkinghorn replies, making one of his quiet bows to my Lady, who is on a sofa near the fire, shading her face with a hand-screen.

"It would be useless to ask," says my Lady with the dreariness of the place in Lincolnshire still upon her, "whether anything has been done."

"Nothing that YOU would call anything has been done to-day," replies Mr. Tulkinghorn.

"Nor ever will be," says my Lady.

== See also ==
- Exposition
- Fiction writing
- Pace
- Show, Don't Tell
