= Vivian Mercier =

Irish literary critic

Vivian Mercier

Vivian Mercier (1919 – 4 November 1989) was an Irish literary critic. He was born at Clara in County Offaly and educated, first, at Portora Royal School, Enniskillen, County Fermanagh, and then, at Trinity College Dublin. He was elected a Scholar of the college in 1938, and edited the student magazine T.C.D. Miscellany.

After taking his doctorate at Trinity, he taught in American universities from the 1940s to the 1980s; his last post was Professor of English at the University of California, Santa Barbara. He is perhaps best known for his famous summation of the plot of Samuel Beckett's Waiting for Godot: "... has achieved a theoretical impossibility—a play in which nothing happens, that yet keeps audiences glued to their seats. What's more, since the second act is a subtly different reprise of the first, he has written a play in which nothing happens, twice." (The Irish Times, 18 February 1956, p. 6.). Despite what may sound like a somewhat disparaging criticism, Mercier was one of the foremost Beckett scholars of his day, and wrote extensively about Godot. He also wrote a critically acclaimed study of Beckett's work as a whole, Beckett/Beckett.

Mercier died in 1989, the same year as Beckett. His last marriage (1974–1989) was to the Irish novelist and children's writer Eilís Dillon, who edited his posthumous book, Modern Irish Literature: Sources and Founders (Oxford, 1994). He is buried beside his wife in his hometown of Clara.
