= Play (play) =

Play by Samuel Beckett

- Original language: German
- Written by: Samuel Beckett
- Characters: M W1; W2

Premiere
- Date: 14 June 1963
- Place: Ulmer Theatre, Ulm-Donau, West Germany

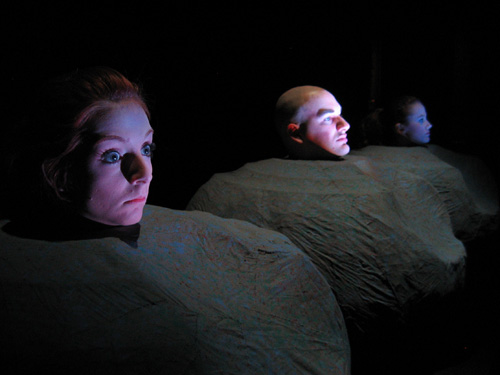
An SMSU Theatre Program production of 'Play' by Samuel Beckett.

Play is a one-act play by Samuel Beckett. It was written between 1962 and 1963 and first produced in German as Spiel on 14 June 1963 at the Ulmer Theatre in Ulm-Donau, Germany, directed by Deryk Mendel, with Nancy Illig (W1), Sigfrid Pfeiffer (W2) and Gerhard Winter (M). The first performance in English was on 7 April 1964 at the Old Vic in London. It was not well-received upon its British premiere.

== Synopsis ==
The curtain rises on three identical grey funeral "urns", about three feet tall by preference, arranged in a row facing the audience. They contain three stock characters. In the middle urn is a man (M). To his right is his wife (W1) or long-time partner. The third urn holds his mistress (W2). Their "[f]aces [are] so lost to age and aspect as to seem almost part of the urns." Beckett had used similar imagery before, Mahood's jar in The Unnameable, for example, or the dustbins occupied by Nell and Nagg in Endgame.

At the beginning and end of the play, a spotlight picks out all three faces, and all three characters recite their own lines, in what Beckett terms a "chorus"; the effect is unintelligible. The main part of this play is made up of short, occasionally fragmented sentences spoken in a "[r]apid tempo throughout" "which in his 1978 rehearsals [he] likened to a lawn mower – a burst of energy followed by a pause, a renewed burst followed by another pause." "He wrote each part separately, then interspersed them, working over the proper breaks in the speeches for a long time before he was satisfied."

One character speaks at a time and only when a strong spotlight shines in his or her face. The style is reminiscent of Mouth's logorrhoea in Not I, the obvious difference being that these characters constantly use first person pronouns. Clichés and puns abound. While one is talking the other two are silent and in darkness. They neither acknowledge the existence of the others around them (M: "To think we were never together") nor appear aware of anything outside their own being and past (W2: "At the same time I prefer this to . . . the other thing. Definitely. There are endurable moments"). Beckett writes that this spotlight "provokes" the character's speech, and insists that whenever possible, a single, swivelling light should be used, rather than separate lights switching on and off. In this manner the spotlight is "expressive of a unique inquisitor". Billie Whitelaw referred to it as "an instrument of torture." The spotlight is in effect the play's fourth character.

In an almost fugal style the three obsess over the affair. Each presents his or her own version of the truth told in the past tense and each from his or her respective points of view. It is one of Beckett's most 'musical' pieces with "a chorus for three voices, orchestration, stage directions concerning tempo, volume and tone, a da capo repeat of the entire action" and a short coda.

Towards the end of the script, there is the concise instruction: "Repeat play." Beckett elaborates on this in the notes, by saying that the repeat might be varied. "[I]n the London production, variations were introduced: a weakening of light and voices in the first repeat, and more so in the second; an abridged second opening; increasing breathlessness; changes in the order of the opening words." The purpose of this is to suggest a gradual winding down of the action for he writes of "the impression of falling off which this would give, with the suggestion of a conceivable dark and silence in the end, or of an indefinite approximating towards it." At the end of this second repeat, the play appears as if it is about to start again for a third time (as in Act Without Words II), but does not get more than a few seconds into it before it suddenly stops.

=== The affair ===
"The affair was unexceptional. From the moment when the man tried to escape his tired marriage and odious professional commitments by taking a mistress, [events took a predictable enough course:] the wife soon began to ‘smell her off him’; there were painful recriminations when the wife accused the man, hired a private detective, threatened to kill herself, and confronted the mistress in an old rambling house reminiscent of Watt (and where the servant again is 'Erskine') ... The man renounced the mistress, was forgiven by his wife who 'suggested a little jaunt to celebrate, to the Riviera or ... Grand Canary,' and then, [true to form], returned to the mistress, this time to elope with her. [In time] their relationship too became jaded, and the man" abandons her as well.

According to Knowlson and John Pilling in Frescoes of the Skull: the later prose and drama of Samuel Beckett, “"[T]he three figures in Play … are not three-dimensional characters. Any attempt to analyse them as if they were would be absurd. The stereotype predominates … [They] belong … to the artificial world of melodrama and romance embodied in romanticized fiction."

== Biographical references ==
During the late 1950s when staying in London, Beckett often met with Barbara Bray, at the time a script-editor with the BBC. A small and attractive widow in her thirties, she was also intelligent and well read. “Beckett seems to have been immediately attracted to her and she to him. Their encounter was highly significant for them both, for it represented the beginning of a relationship that was to last, in parallel with that with of [his long-time partner] Suzanne, for the rest of his life.” In short time their association became “a very intimate and personal one.”

“In a visit to Paris in January 1961, Barbara ... informed Beckett that she intended to move [there] to live permanently” “a move which had been discussed more than once with Sam.” His response was unusual. In March he married Suzanne in a civil ceremony in the seaside town of Folkestone, England. Ostensibly this was to ensure if he died before her Suzanne would “inherit the rights to his work, since, under French law, there was no ‘common-law wife’ legislation … Or he may simply have wanted to affirm where his true loyalty lay. Whatever the reason, the marriage made it clear … that he was unwilling to leave the woman with whom he had already lived for more than twenty years.”

For all that, in June 1961 Bray still decided to move and despite his recent marriage “[a]lmost every day [he went] round, often spending a good part of the day or a large part of the evening there.” “Oddly enough, this side of his life was [not well] known about in Paris ... [Beckett’s] natural reserve and well-developed sense of decorum were allied to his fear of giving offence to Suzanne.” Anthony Cronin notes that strangely – or perhaps not so strangely – during this time he was often to be found talking “fervently and seriously about suicide.” Despite his unwillingness to do much about it he was clearly suffering badly from guilt.

To comply with the law, Beckett “was obliged to be in residence in Folkestone for a minimum of two weeks to allow him to be married in the Registry Office there” and this time spent there observing the locals may well have influenced the “middle class, English, ‘Home Counties’” setting of Play and his use in the play of the names of “Ash and Snodland” which are both the names of towns in Kent, although James Knowlson points to two visits to Sweetwater at about the same time.

It was during the first London production that he encountered Billie Whitelaw for the first time. “Whitelaw’s deep brooding voice caught so many inflections that Beckett found himself at times listening to her instead of rehearsing the play.”

== Reception ==
In 1998, David Benedict of The Independent argued that Play is a "finer, more dramatically distilled" work than Waiting for Godot (1953).

== Interpretations ==
“The earliest version (April 1962) was written for a woman and two men, Syke and Conk, figures in white boxes. In the final version we are presented instead with, as Michael Robinson describes it in The Long Sonata of the Dead: A Study of Samuel Beckett, “the three corners of love’s eternal triangle (the emphasis here is on the eternal) … They have no names [now], simply the designations M, W1 and W2 which aim at anonymity but also stand for all men and women who have, like them, been caught up in a three-part love affair,”

The play is entitled Play, in the same way that Beckett's only venture into film is called Film but as always with Beckett there are other levels. “Speaking of his previous life the man remarks: ‘I know now, all that was just … play’, but what then is the meaning of ‘all this? And when will this become the same?’ All three characters admit that life was senseless yet there appears to be ‘no sense in this … either, none whatsoever’; though this does not prevent them from making ‘the same mistakes as when it was the sun that shone, of looking for sense where possibly there is none. They are playing … a pointless game with unending time of which they are the playthings.” This also could be a reference to one of the world's most famous theatrical metaphors: “All the world's a stage, And all the men and women merely players.”

In writing to George Devine, who directed the Old Vic production, Beckett suggests that “the inquirer (light) begins to emerge as no less a victim of his inquiry than they and as needing to be free, within narrow limits, literally to act the part, i.e. to vary only slightly his speeds and intensities.” But the role of the light is even more ambiguous, for it has also been seen as “a metaphor for our attention (relentless, all-consuming, whimsical)” and a way of “switching on and switching off speech exactly as a playwright does when he moves from one line of dialogue on his page to the next.” Neither of these analogies conflicts with the more popular views where the spotlight is believed to represent God, or some other moral agent tasked with assessing, each character's case to be relieved from the binds of the urn by having them relive this relationship, which has ruined all their lives. This view ascribes a motive to the light beyond mere torture. That may not be the case. Just as easily as God, the light could represent the devil.

This reliving of the details surrounding the affair only takes up the first half of the text however; Beckett called this part the ‘Narration.’ As Paul Lawley says in "Beckett’s dramatic counterpoint: a reading of Play", “[T]he second half of the text (preceded by a five second long blackout) – called ‘Meditation’ by Beckett himself – sheds a subtle new light on the first. In the Meditation each of the heads casts about for the sense of its situation, considers the nature of the light, probes for certainties amid the darkness and then makes an attempt to imagine what has happened to the other two corners of this particular Eternal Triangle ... We can now see that the heads are not chained exclusively to their ‘past’, their narration(s): they are victims of the light, certainly, but not only victims, for they can recognize themselves as such and can speak of the light when forced to speak by the light. The light obliges them to speak but it does not necessarily determine what they speak – yet we only realize this in the Meditation section of the text.”

“They cope with the light in various ways and natures. W1 screams at the light: ‘Get off me’ and she wonders what she must do to satisfy the disturbing and tormenting light. W2 is content with the idea that the light must know that she is doing her best. But she also wonders if she is perhaps a little ‘unhinged’ (meaning that she may go mad). For M the light enables fantasy. He imagines the two women drinking green tea together in the places they have each been with him and comforting each other. He fantasises waking up with both women and then going for a boat trip with the two of them on a summer's afternoon. “At the end of the second part, M is completely aware of the mechanism of the light but not aware of his own narcissism” however.

“If the play consisted only of the Narration it would be as though the light were obliging them not only to speak, but to speak only of these events, to tell only this story.”

Many of Beckett's plays and prose pieces are located “in ‘places’ which may strike us as being most adequately described as ‘Hell’, ‘Limbo’ or ‘Purgatory’– and the parallels with Dante are always tempting” – and indeed the most popular interpretation of Play is that the three are in some place like this. The use of urns to encase the bodies of the three players is thought to symbolise their entrapment inside the demons of their past; the way in which all three urns are described at the start of the play as "touching" each other is often deciphered as symbolising the shared problem which all three characters have endured.

“The whole situation resembles very closely that of Bérénice, in which two men, the Emperor Titus and King Antiochus, are in love with the heroine; Bérénice, for her part, is in love with Titus and regards Antiochus as her dearest friend. Yet the tragedy ends, bloodlessly, with Titus remaining unwillingly in Rome, while the other two reluctantly leave the city to go their separate ways. By the end of Bérénice, all three major characters have threatened to commit suicide; perhaps the three characters in Play are being punished because they have committed suicide. The text certainly indicates that very least the husband might have “sought refuge in death” also “[n]ot only does W1 threaten both her own life and that of W2, but W1 describes herself as ‘Dying for dark,’ and W2 affirms, ‘I felt like death.’ As so often with Beckett, the loose clichés assume an eerie literality.”

Beckett tasked himself with re-reading all of Racine’s plays in the mid-1950s and James Knowlson suggests that “this daily diet of Racinian claustrophobia forced Beckett to concentrate on the true essentials of theatre: Time, Space and Speech [which] pointed him in the direction that made a tightly focused, monologic play like Happy Days or Play possible.

It is conceivable that the three parties are not actually dead at all. Purgatory is, after all, not a theological concept Beckett would have been brought up with though Dante’s interpretation of it did catch his imagination. In the final paragraph of his 1929 essay "Dante...Bruno. Vico...Joyce" (whose strained, unpleasant second sentence reads, in full, "The conception of Philosophy and Philology as a pair of nigger minstrels out of the Teatro dei Piccoli is soothing, like the contemplation of a carefully folded ham-sandwich"), Beckett makes a striking comparison between Dante's version of Purgatory and Joyce's: “Dante's is conical and consequently implies culmination. Mr. Joyce's is spherical and excludes culmination … On this earth that is [his] Purgatory.". If the trio are separated physically then each would be in a private hell where he or she imagines and reimagines what may have happened to the other two and relives the events of the narration in his or her own mind. If we view the three urns purely as a theatrical device to bring these separate points of view together this interpretation is also valid. “Life on earth, the endless recurring cycle of history, constitutes Purgatory for Joyce in Finnegans Wake. From Joyce’s Purgatory there is no escape, not even for the individual human being, who dies only to be reborn into the cycle. Likewise Beckett’s take on Purgatory is that it “is a state rather than a process.”

=== Music ===
In 1965 Philip Glass composed music for a production of Play. The piece was scored for two soprano saxophones, and is his first work in a minimalist idiom – an idiom which was substantially influenced by the work of Beckett.

=== Film ===
==== Comédie (1966) ====
In 1966 Beckett worked with a young director, Marin Karmitz (an assistant to Jean-Luc Godard as well as Roberto Rossellini), on a film version of Play, resulting in the film, Comédie. The cast included Michael Lonsdale, Eléonore Hirt and Delphine Seyrig.

==== Beckett on Film (2000) ====
Another filmed version of Play was directed by Anthony Minghella for the Beckett on Film project, starring Alan Rickman, Kristin Scott Thomas and Juliet Stevenson.

For this particular interpretation of the play, it is assumed that the action takes place in Hell, perhaps in reference to Jean-Paul Sartre's famous assertion, 'Hell is—other people' though T. S. Eliot’s rebuttal, “Hell is oneself,” is probably more accurate. In this filmed version, the action is set in a vast landscape of "urn people", all speaking at once. “This [interpretation] was much turned over, along with doubts whether it should be there at all, in animated discussions that went on throughout the Barbican meeting places.”

A camera is used instead of a stage light to provoke the characters into action; Minghella uses a jump cut editing technique to make it seem as though there are even more than two repetitions of the text. He “made the equipment into a threatening force by switching it with bullying speed from one face to another, forcing unusual speed of delivery for the actors. Juliet Stevenson told [ Katharine Worth ] that during rehearsals she had wondered whether the lines were being delivered too fast for viewers to take in their sense [but] theatre critic, Alice Griffin ... thought that the lines ‘came across more clearly and more easily understandable than sometimes in the theatre.’ This she attributed partly to Minghella's use of close-up, a recurring feature of the film versions naturally enough.”

The postmodern outlook of the film ("a field of urns in a dismal swamp, a gnarled, blasted oak in the background, a lowering, Chernobyl sky") was however criticized by The Guardian's Art critic Adrian Searle as "adolescent, and worse, clichéd and illustrational," adding: "Any minute, expect a dragon". It is also perhaps noteworthy that this version does not feature the last section of the script, in which the characters almost embark upon a third cycle of the text.

See also:

- Beckett on Film Official site
- Play at Beckett on Film, Official site
