= Antonio Pantojas =

Puerto Rican actor and comedian

- Born: November 25, 1948; Santurce, Puerto Rico
- Died: October 2, 2017 (aged 68); New York, New York
- Occupation(s): Actor, Female impersonator, Dancer, Comedian
- Years active: 1968–2017

Antonio Pantojas (November 25, 1948 – October 2, 2017) was an actor, comedian, dancer and a pioneer in the art of drag.

== Early years ==
Antonio Pantojas was born in Santurce and raised in Río Piedras, the largest district of the city of San Juan, Puerto Rico, in the San José area. At the age of 10, his greatest passion was dancing. His dance teachers at the time were Madame Brewer and Mario Cox. Later, in his high school years, his Spanish teacher offered him a scholarship with dancing professor Ana García.

Pantojas's professional training led him to become the dancing instructor and director of the San José Ballet, in Río Piedras. His mission was to promote wholesome and enjoyable cultural, folkloric, and ballet dancing in his town. Later he enrolled in Ballets de San Juan (the San Juan Ballet Company), and participated in the Ita Medina and Sarita Ayala's ballet companies as well.

Pantojas, broadening his horizons, started taking acting lessons with Ernesto Concepción in Walter Mercado's Academy. He also earned a Bachelor's degree in theater at the Departamento de Drama (Drama Faculty) of the University of Puerto Rico in Río Piedras.

== Theater debut ==
As the 1970s came about, he made his professional debut as an actor at the Latin American Theater Festival in the Coop-Arte theater in Barrio Obrero Santurce. He later performed the role of Herod, in Jesus Christ Superstar at the Matienzo Theater in Santurce, alongside Marian Pabón, among others.

== Drag performances ==
Pantoja's career as a transvestite performer began when he was auditioning for a role in a theater production, and the only one left was a woman's part. He accepted the challenge to portray that role, and it was an epiphany. From then on, it became his primary career.

He wrote over 20 club acts, which he took throughout Puerto Rico, the Dominican Republic, the United States, Mexico and Peru. He also hosted his own talk show, Estoy aquí (I'm Here), on WIPR-TV, channel 6-affiliated broadcasting (from PBS).

A seasoned night club varieté entertainer, Pantojas made waves beginning in the Puerto Rico night club scene during the 1970s, with his musical incendiary political satires and his gender-bending characters. A versatile thespian, he played roles as diverse as Estragon and Pozzo in Waiting for Godot, Juliet in El público (The Audience) by Federico García Lorca (in its world premiere in Puerto Rico in 1978), and the small-time street-wise narrator in La verdadera historia de Pedro Navaja, one of the longest-running plays in Puerto Rico's history, based on the Three Penny Opera. Pantojas produced, directed, taught, wrote and performed for more than 12 years for the Productora Nacional de Teatro, Inc., a department from the Instituto de Cultura Puertorriqueña (National Cultural Ministry) in Puerto Rico from which he staged his versions of Alexandre Dumas, fils’ Camille, Lorca's La casa de Bernarda Alba (The House of Bernarda Alba), Jules Tasca, An American Comedy, Venezuelan Isaac Chocrón's La revolución (The Revolution), Argentine Alejandro Robino's Manzana podrida (Rotten Apple) and Chilean Marco Antonio De la Parra's La secreta obscenidad de cada día (The Secret Obscenity of Every Day), as well as the theatrical versions of Weekend at Bernie's and The Full Monty. Pantojas also appeared in various plays, including La Cage Aux Folles (The Bird's Cage), as "Zaza" and "Albin", and Love, Valour and Compassion as "Buzz". As a playwright, he took several workshops in New York City (writing) and Florence (creativity).

== Recent years ==
In 2003, Pantojas moved to New York, and decided that due to his age he would not perform again as a transvestite actor. Pantojas stated that his face and his body had changed, and as he was a versatile actor, he could carry out different roles, pursuing his career as a performer in many ways.

He portrayed a priest, Father Amado, in the theater production El silencio es salud (Silence Is Health), performed at the Centro Cultural Clemente Soto Vélez (The Clemente Soto Cultural Center) on the Lower East Side of Manhattan, and he was featured as Amalia in the motion picture Under My Nails (2012).

He died of a heart attack on October 2, 2017.

== See also ==
- List of Puerto Ricans
- List of vaudeville performers: L-Z
