= Act Without Words I =

1957 play by Samuel Beckett

- Written by: Samuel Beckett
- Mute: Man
- Date premiered: 3 April 1957
- Place premiered: Royal Court Theatre, London
- Original language: French
- Setting: A desert

Act Without Words I is a short play by Samuel Beckett. It is a mime, Beckett's first (followed by Act Without Words II). Like many of Beckett's works, the play was originally written in French (Acte sans paroles I), being translated into English by Beckett himself. It was written in 1956 following a request from the dancer Deryk Mendel and first performed on 3 April 1957 at the Royal Court Theatre in London. On that occasion it followed a performance of Endgame. The original music to accompany the performance was written by composer John S. Beckett, Samuel's cousin, who would later collaborate with him on the radio play Words and Music.

== Synopsis ==
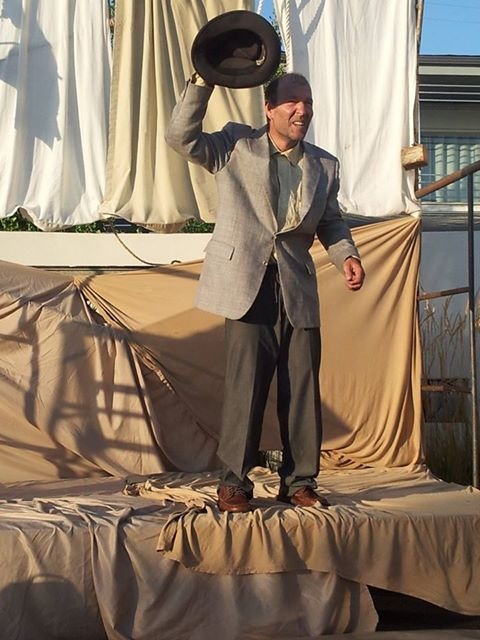
An outdoor production at the Modern Hotel in Boise, Idaho

The action takes place in a desert illuminated by a "dazzling light". The cast consists of just one man, who, at the start of the play, is “flung backwards” onto the stage. After he lands he hears a whistle from the right wing. He “takes the sound for some kind of call, and after a bit of reflection, proceeds in that direction only to find himself hurled back again. Next the sound issues from the left. The scene is repeated in reverse.” There is clearly no exit. He sits on the ground and looks at his hands.

A number of objects are then lowered into this set beginning with a palm tree with “a single bough some three yards from the ground,” “a caricature of the Tree of Life.” Its arrival is announced, as is that of each object which follows, with the same sharp whistle. On being made aware of its existence the man moves into its shade and continues looking at his hands. “A pair of tailor’s scissors descends from the flies” but again the man doesn’t notice them until he hears the whistle. He then starts to trim his nails.

Over the course of the play other items are lowered from above: three cubes of varying sizes, a length of knotted rope and – always just out of reach – a “tiny carafe, to which is attached a huge label inscribed WATER.”

The rest of the sketch is a study in frustrated efforts. “Armed with two natural tools, mind and hands, those tools, which separate him from lower orders of animals, he tries to survive, to secure some water in the desert. The mind works, at least in part: he learns – small cube on large; he invents, or is given inventions – scissors, cubes, rope. But when he learns to use his tools effectively, they are confiscated: the scissors, when he reasons that in addition to cutting his fingernails, he might cut his throat; the blocks and rope, when he discovers that they might make a gallows.” (Vladimir and Estragon also contemplate suicide in this way at the end of Waiting for Godot). Beckett is here drawing on his viewing of the silent screen comedies of the like of Buster Keaton, Ben Turpin and Harry Langdon all of whom would have encountered objects on-screen apparently with minds of their own.

Eventually it looks as if he's given up and he sits on the big cube. After a while, this is pulled up from beneath him, and he is left on the ground. From this point on he refuses to ‘play the game’ any further; even when the carafe of water is dangled in front of his face he does not make to grab it. The palms for the tree open, providing shade once more, but he doesn’t move. He simply sits there in the dazzling light looking at his hands.

== Interpretation ==
On one level Act Without Words I “seems a behaviourist experiment within a classical myth”, that of Tantalus, who stood in a pool of water which receded every time he bent to drink it, and stood under a fruit tree which raised its branches every time he reached for food. In the 1930s Beckett read Wolfgang Köhler’s book, The Mentality of Apes about the colony of apes in Tenerife, where experiments were conducted in which the apes also placed cubes on top of another in order to reach a banana” and is clearly referenced in this piece.

Tantalus was punished for stealing ambrosia and nectar. It is not certain that the man is being punished for a crime other than that of existing in the first place. The situation is similar to that of the narrator in Beckett's 1955 The Expelled, whose story begins with him being jettisoned from the place he was living (“The fall was … not serious. Even as I fell I heard the door slam, which brought me a little comfort … [for] that meant they were not pursuing me down the street with a stick, to beat me.”) “into an environment where he cannot exist but cannot escape … Whereas Godot’s existence remains uncertain, here an external force exists” “represented by a sharp, inhuman, disembodied whistle” which will not permit him to leave; “like Jacob, [he] wrestles with it to illustrate its substance.” In simplistic terms the man's actual fall could be seen to represent the Fall of man.

The fact that the man is literally, as far as the audience is concerned, thrown into existence brings to mind the Heideggerian concept of Geworfenheit (‘Throwness’).” Heidegger is clearly using the expression metaphorically as is Beckett; the man is expelled from a womb-like condition, from non-being into being. This is not the first time Beckett has used light to symbolise existence: “They give birth astride of a grave, the light gleams an instant, then it’s night once more.” The protagonist is nameless, he is Everyman. “As Beckett told Barney Rosset, his longtime U.S. publisher, in 1957: he is just ‘human meat or bones.’”

When he first looks at his hands it is “”as though [he is] noticing his own body for the first time … Having become cognisant of his Dasein … [he is willing to] accept the presence of various Seiendes”, as Heidegger calls existing objects, that start to appear beginning with the tree.

When the scissors arrive the man begins to trim his nails “for no other reason than the sudden availability of the correct object. The scissors of course could stand for any other useful object of daily living such as a house or car, objects whose "thereness" is most often taken for granted.”

The play is a parable of resignation; a state one reaches only after a series of disappointments. The man has learned ‘the hard way’ that there is nothing he can rely on in life other than himself.

G. C. Barnard argues the prevalent interpretation of the ending; the protagonist does not move because he is simply crushed: ‘the man remains, defeated, having opted out of the struggle, lying on the empty desert.’ “But within this obvious, traditional ending, Beckett works his consummate skill, for the real play begins with its terminus. The climactic ending of the mime may signify not a pathetic defeat, but a conscious rebellion, man’s deliberate refusal to obey. Lucky has finally turned on Pozzo. Ironically then, the protagonist is most active when inert, and his life acquires meaning at its end. In this refusal, this cutting of the umbilical rope, a second birth occurs, the birth of Man.” Man has given birth to himself even though it appears it will mean the death of him. It is a victory of sorts, albeit a hollow one.

=== Beckett on Film ===
Sean Foley in Karel Reisz's film of the play

A filmed version of Act Without Words I was directed by Karel Reisz for the 2001 Beckett on Film project, with music specially composed by Michael Nyman.
