= Eh Joe =

Play by Samuel Beckett

Eh Joe is a piece for television, written in English by Samuel Beckett, his first work for the medium. It was begun on the author's fifty-ninth birthday, 13 April 1965, and completed by 1 May. "It [was] followed by six undated typescripts (numbered 0 – 4 and 'final version').”

Despite the English version being recorded first, due to delays at the BBC, the first actual broadcast was of Elmar and Erika Tophoven's German translation, He Joe, on 13 April 1966, Beckett's sixtieth birthday, by Süddeutscher Rundfunk, Stuttgart; Beckett directed, his first credit as such. Deryk Mendel played Joe and Nancy Illig voiced the woman.

An American production of Eh Joe was directed by frequent Beckett collaborator Alan Schneider, produced by Glenn Jordan and broadcast by WNDT on 18 April 1966.

The first English broadcast went out eventually on BBC2 (4 July 1966) with Jack MacGowran, for whom the play was specifically written, playing Joe (originally 'Jack' at the start of the first draft) and Siân Phillips as Voice. Beckett had asked for Billie Whitelaw but she was unavailable due to another acting commitment. Alan Gibson directed but with Beckett in attendance.

At least thirteen versions have been preserved on tape making it far and away Beckett's most produced teleplay.

It was first published in Eh Joe and Other Writings (Faber, 1967) – although the version published is closer to Typescript 3, mentioned above, than the version as broadcast.

First edition: Faber, 1967, showing Jack MacGowran

== The characters ==
=== Joe ===
The play opens with Joe, a grey-haired man in his late fifties, sitting alone in an archetypal Beckettian room. He is wearing an old dressing gown and a pair of carpet slippers.

Like a young child, checking for monsters, Joe methodically goes through his room. As he does so the camera follows him...

1. getting up, going to window, opening window, looking out, closing window, drawing curtain, standing intent.
2. going from window to door, opening door, looking out, closing door, locking door, drawing hanging before door, standing intent.
3. going from door to cupboard, opening cupboard, looking in, closing cupboard, locking cupboard, drawing hanging before cupboard, standing intent.
4. going from cupboard to bed, kneeling down looking under bed, getting up, sitting down on edge of bed as when discovered, beginning to relax.

The camera cuts to a close-up of Joe. His eyes are closed, his features relaxed. Beckett indicates that the close-up should begin with the camera one yard (1 m) from his face and dolly-in gradually throughout the piece. He indicates nine breaks where the camera is allowed to move, four inches (102 mm) closer each time. By the end of the play, the camera is close enough so that only his eyes are in frame. "The numeral nine has often been associated with death", e.g. there are nine circles in Dante's vision of Hell.

As the woman begins to speak Joe opens his eyes and his face displays a look of "intentness". He is trapped, which is how Beckett referred to the room in Film; the situation here is very similar, in fact Beckett originally had Joe on a seat just like O but decided that "a more telling image for a seducer would be alone on a bed". The voice utters nine short speeches during which Beckett requires the actor to remain practically motionless and stare unblinkingly toward – though not directly at – the camera lens, an extraordinary demand for physical restraint to ask of any actor, though in reality there were instances where, when filming, MacGowran did close his eyes for effect (e.g. after the word “Gillette”, he closes his eyes and his face winces in pain). Only during the short gaps, while the camera moves, can he relax his gaze momentarily. Despite these unscripted breaks MacGowran found the role "the most gruelling twenty-two minutes I have ever had in my life" but he also admits it was the only time he was "wholly pleased with this work". He wrote later:

"It’s really photographing the mind. It’s the nearest perfect play for television that you could come across, because the television camera photographs the mind better than anything else".

=== Voice ===
Between camera movements we hear a woman's voice addressing Joe. Beckett specifies that the voice should be as follows: "Low, distinct, remote, little colour, absolutely steady rhythm, slightly slower than normal". The tone throughout is accusatory. Nancy Illig describes the kind of delivery that resulted from her work with Beckett in 1966, as a "hammering staccato”. "The voice becomes a technical device, on a par with the dolly". In the original recording "the vocal colourlessness at which Beckett was aiming was achieved by placing a microphone right up against [the actress’s] mouth and, as her voice was being recorded, both high and low frequencies were filtered out".

Billie Whitelaw, who finally got to tackle the role in 1989, recalls:

"For Eh Joe, I went over to Paris and saw Sam. We read it together. I found it unbearably moving but we read it and he kept on hitting my nose – which is neither here nor there, very sweet – and we read it through and he kept on saying as always, 'No colour, no colour' and 'slow', I mean slower than I’ve ever known him want me to go before, even slower than Footfalls: absolutely flat; absolutely on a monotone.”

"Whitelaw [has] emphasized over and again in her workshops … the difference between playing 'character roles' and acting the Beckett roles she played with 'no colour.' Whitelaw explained how she concentrated her attention on timing, rhythm, and the musicality of texts, as well as creating an active metaphor for a role so that she could play the role with 'no colour.' She also explained how she delivered her lines as a form of ‘Chinese water torture’ so that each phrase of the text was delivered as a drop of water literally dripped into Joe's head".

She remembers that Beckett mentioned "the phrase 'suppressed venom' in relation to the woman. She seems to be jealous of the other women she describes, vindictive. He also said to remember that she is weary ... I must also try to remember that she is a voice in someone else's head, a disembodied voice".

== Synopsis ==
Eh Joe is the complete antithesis to ... but the clouds ... in which a man strains nightly to evoke the image of a woman with little success. Like O in Film, Joe has gone through his routine, doing what he feels he needs to do to protect himself and like the man in Film he is sitting quietly thinking he is safe. But he is not. It is not a face he finds watching himself but a voice he hears, a woman's voice. As the voice progresses we move closer and closer to Joe.

To Alan Schneider, Beckett wrote on 7 April 1966: "Voice should be whispered. A dead voice in his head. Minimum of colour. Attacking. Each sentence a knife going in, pause for withdrawal, then in again."

36" – The voice wants to know if Joe has checked everything. Why is he still sitting there with the light on? Why doesn't he go to bed? He's changed the covers.

32" – She reminds him that he'd told her that the best was still to come but that it was the last thing he did say to her as he hurried her into her coat and bundled her out the door.

28" – She is not the first voice that has come to him like this, in his mind; although the woman hints that the source may be external. His father's voice came to him for years until Joe found a way to stop him talking, to metaphorically throttle him, then his mother and finally, others, “[a]ll the others", everyone it seems who ever loved him.

24" – She asks if there is anyone left who might love him. He's reduced to paying for sex, once a week. She warns him to be careful he doesn't run out of people to take advantage of because then there would only be him left to adore him until he too died. She assures him that she is not in heaven and not to expect to go there himself.

20" – The woman recalls one time the two of them were together. It was summer, they were sitting together on the grass watching the ducks, holding hands and exchanging vows. He'd complimented her on her elocution and she remarks how well he used to express himself. Now, like he did with his parents and the others, he has “[s]queezed her down to this", the slow monotonous drone we hear. She knows her time is limited and wonders when all she will have left is a whisper. She lashes out at him and asks him to imagine if he never managed to rid himself of her until he died and was with her in death himself.

16"– Joe has been a religious man. She wants to know if he's as righteous as he used to profess to be. She quotes from the parable of Jesus about the rich man and says one day God will talk to him like she is doing and, when he does, it'll be time for him to die.

12" – Joe had said that the best was to come. She tells him that, for her at least, it did. She found someone far better than he was and lists off all the ways.

8" – She did all right. "But there was one didn’t". One of Joe's other loves, a young, slim, pale girl did not fare so well. He said the same thing to her that the best was yet to come, just as he did with Voice, as he bundled the girl out the door with no intention of furthering the relationship now he'd got what he wanted from her. In fact his aeroplane ticket was in his pocket ready for him to make good his escape. The timeline is unclear but the likelihood is that his relationship with Voice came first.

4" – She wants to know if Joe knew what happened to her, if she'd told him. Of course she hadn't. The first he'd heard about it was an announcement in the Independent. Joe tries harder to throttle the voice. She knows her time is short and begins to goad him. "Mud thou art", she tells him – more commonly heard as "dust thou art, and unto dust shalt thou return" – Genesis 3:19.

0" – The woman proceeds to tell him what exactly happened to the girl he abandoned. Voice describes her going down to the sea close to her house wearing only her lavender slip where she attempts to drown herself but it doesn't work. The girl returns to the house, sopping wet, fetches a razor – the make Joe recommended to her – goes back down the garden, this time to the viaduct, where she also fails to slit her wrists. She tears a strip of silk from her slip and ties it round the scratch. She goes back to the house and this time gets some tablets. She takes a few on her way back down the garden. When she reaches the viaduct she decides to head further down near the Rock and takes some more on the way. When she reaches the spot she empties the tube and lies down in the end with her face a few feet from the – presumably incoming – tide.

At this point Beckett added the following instruction, which is not included in the printed text: "Eyes remember".

Joe makes a concerted effort at this point and the woman's voice drops to a whisper. She makes Joe imagine the girl lying there, describing events in erotic terms: “… part the lips … solitaire … Breasts in the stones …Imagine the hands … What are they fondling? … There’s love for you …” Another change Beckett made here was to add in a greater degree of repetition, particularly the word "imagine" emphasising that what we are hearing here is primarily a work of imagination rather than simple recollection.

The voice falls silent and the image fades out. Joe has finally rid himself of her. As his face vanishes we realise he is smiling, an important addition Beckett made to the play but which was never incorporated in the printed text. "Here, for the first time, Joe looks at the camera". This may not represent a final victory but he has silenced her for now.

== Interpretation ==
Joe does not come across as a particularly likeable man. On the surface he is like many of Beckett's lonely old men, affected by the effects of the choices he has made, but whereas many have simply ended up where they are by avoiding humanity, Joe has used and discarded it, particularly its women. But does he feel responsible, let alone guilty, for his actions? Either way, something is playing on his mind. The woman's voice that carps at him acts as if she is "a representation, an exteriorization of Joe’s internal conflict" but the reality is she is "not only the voice of memory, even memory rearranged or juxtaposed, but at least creative if not created memory, that is, memory leaching into imagination or creativity. Were she not, how could he "squeeze away" at her until he finally silences her completely? Beckett was very specific when writing to Alan Schneider: "An inner voice from the past".

In the "version of He Joe directed by Walter Asmus and Beckett, recorded in Germany 1979 … [t]he camera pursues Joe in line with the text’s instructions; but Joe is positioned on the right of the frame, and he does not look at the camera as it moves inexorably closer. The effect is to deepen the ambiguity of the voice’s location; Joe’s posture suggests that the voice is whispering directly into his ear, but the place where the one whispering would normally sit is, the framing constantly reminds us, empty".

Why a woman though and why this particular woman? "Aspects of consciousness, according to Jung, can become almost independent personalities and might even 'become visible or audible. They appear as visions, they speak in voices which are like the voices of definite people.'” "His protagonist represents an aspect of psychological duality, akin to Jung’s Anima or Shadow. Voice in Eh Joe is less Joe’s dark or evil side than his opposite: feminine, constant, secure and irreligious, to Joe’s masculine, lecherous, dishonest but (surprisingly) religious self",

There is little material to build a fully rounded character but the woman appears to have been a survivor. Whereas the other one, “[t]he green one" as she calls her, couldn't bear to live without Joe, the woman whose voice Joe hears made a better life for herself without him. She is the logical choice for Joe's last surviving accuser. In many respects she is the distillation of all the previous voices, a last gasp, pointing an accusing finger at him on behalf of herself and all the others, particularly the suicide. In doing so 'he finds that hell is not only other people but himself'.

We learn nothing about why his mother or father might trouble him after their deaths but disapproving or disappointed parents are plentiful enough throughout Beckett's work. Joe suffers his father's 'ghost' for years until he realises that he can affect it, that by an act of will he can stop the words, to make the literally dead also figuratively dead. In a letter sent to MacGreevy on 6 April 1965, Beckett writes: "I shake at the thought of the ordeal you have been through. At least you are through it. You mustn't give up. Putting down memories is enough to make anyone crack." This is what Beckett means by the expression "All your dead dead", those 'ghosts' that he has exorcised in this way. This is reminiscent of the following lines from The Expelled:

Memories are killing. So you must not think of certain things, or those that are dear to you, or rather you must think of them, for if you don't there is the danger of finding them, in your mind, little by little. That is to say, you must think of them for a while, a good while, every day several times a day, until they sink forever in the mud. That's an order.

"The play is full of verbs conveying what Joe’s voice describes as 'mental thuggee’: throttle, muzzle, spike, squeeze, tighten, silence, garrotte, finish, mum, strangle, stamp out, exterminate, still, kill, lay, choke". “'It is his passion to kill the voices which he cannot kill,’ said Beckett".

The religious subtext did not exist in the earliest drafts. Beckett incorporated it after a two-week break in working on the play. He makes Joe a Catholic (as the prayer to Mary suggests) and, as the Catholic Church views suicide as a mortal sin, how would Joe feel if he thought he might be even indirectly responsible for this? This, of course, brings up the whole issue of Catholic guilt. An omission in all printed versions is the capitalization in the expression, "The passion of our Joe", which Beckett wanted to read – though of course it makes no difference to the performance – "The passion of Our Joe".

It has been suggested that Joe is actually masturbating while all this is going on – and some of Voice's remarks do, not unreasonably, attack his current level of sexual prowess – but scholars tend to skim over the imagery used in the final section of Voice's diatribe so it is difficult to give anything more than a speculative interpretation. Beckett certainly has not shied away from the subject (it appears in Mercier and Camier for example) but there is a danger of reading too much into Beckett rather than just enough.

== Stage productions ==
All of Beckett's theatrical work is readily available to the general public apart from the television plays. In an attempt to introduce audiences theatre directors have sought means to translate the works from one medium to another within the bounds of tolerance of the Beckett Foundation. The Canadian filmmaker Atom Egoyan successfully premiered a version of Eh Joe at the Gate Theatre in Dublin in April 2006 featuring Michael Gambon as Joe with Penelope Wilton as Voice. Karen Fricker wrote in The Guardian:

"Egoyan's answer is to mix the media: a live camera just offstage is trained on Michael Gambon's face, and the image is projected on to a scrim in front of the playing area. This not only delivers the text, but adds fresh nuances: the motionlessness of Gambon's body contrasts ironically and pathetically with the emotions (defiance, boredom, regret, fatigue, anger) playing across that amazing, expressive, baggy face.

"The darkness of the theatre and most of the playing area, and the sheer size of the projected image of Gambon's face – it fills nearly the whole height of the proscenium – create an atmosphere of near-unbearable intensity, like living inside someone else's filthy conscience.

"Its excellence makes a crucial point in the current atmosphere of centenary reverence: that new interpretive strategies are not a threat, but in fact bring new life to the work".

Gambon subsequently reprised the role in London and was due to appear at the Sydney Festival in January 2007 for a special Beckett Season but had to pull out for personal reasons. He was replaced by Charles Dance.

In July 2008 Egoyan's production played New York City with Wilton still as Voice, now joined by Liam Neeson as Joe.

A more controversial staged interpretation was created by actor/director Cradeaux Alexander at the Kraine Theatre in 2000. His reworking removed the old man completely from the proceedings and divided the woman's speech between three actresses and an actor, leaving the audience to stand in as the beleaguered Joe. Among other things, the audience isn't Joe and doesn't share his history. Without him present to convey his guilt they are merely eavesdroppers. The performance also incorporated seventies disco music and male nudity. In an interview, Alexander had this to say:

"That production caused a huge stirring, some absolutely despising what I’d done with it and others absolutely loving it – and from that point on I knew I was on the right track. I was even threatened with legal action by the Beckett Foundation if I continued with it! This of course only caused me to fortify my resolve".

Eh Joe was the fourth and final play in a collection of short Beckett plays at the New York Theatre Workshop directed by JoAnne Akalaitis, starring Mikhail Baryshnikov and featuring new music by Philip Glass. The quartet, which started performances in December 2007, began with Act Without Words I, Act Without Words II, and Rough for Theatre I before finishing with Eh Joe. Karen Kandel played the Voice. The New York Theatre Workshop and the aforementioned Kraine Theatre are in adjacent buildings on the theatre-rich Fourth Street Arts Block between Second Avenue and the Bowery in Manhattan.
