= Act Without Words =

Act Without Words may refer to:

- Act Without Words I, play by Samuel Beckett
- Act Without Words II, play by Samuel Beckett
