= Deryk Mendel =

Deryk Mendel (1920 – 28 May 2013) was a British ballet dancer, choreographer, actor and director.

He was a friend of Samuel Beckett, who wrote the one-act mime Act Without Words I for him in 1956. Music was by his cousin John S. Beckett. Mendel performed the premiere on 3 April 1957 at the Royal Court Theatre in London.

On 14 June 1963, Mendel directed the premiere of Becket's Play (as Spiel) at the Ulmer Theatre in Ulm-Donau, Germany.

On 13 April 1966, Beckett's sixtieth birthday, Mendel appeared as Joe in the premiere of Eh Joe by Süddeutscher Rundfunk, Stuttgart, the first time that Beckett himself had directed.

In 1968, Mendel directed one of the first English performances of Beckett's Come and Go at the Royal Festival Hall, with Adrienne Corri, Marie Kean and Billie Whitelaw in the roles of Flo, Vi, and Ru.

He died in Saint-Ouen, France on 28 May 2013.
