= Under My Nails =

2012 film directed by Ari Maniel Cruz

- Film poster
- Under My Nails
- Directed by: Ari Maniel Cruz
- Written by: Kisha Tikina Burgos
- Screenplay by: Kisha Tikina Burgos
- Produced by: Ari Maniel Cruz; Kisha Tikina Burgos; Andrei Nemcik Toledo; Esteban Lima (Executive)
- Starring: Kisha Tikina Burgos; Iván Camilo; Dolores Pedro; Antonio Pantojas
- Cinematography: Corey Gegner
- Edited by: Andrei Nemcik
- Music by: Colectivo-Elentronica-Isleno; Omar Silva
- Production company: La Teta
- Release date: October 25, 2012 (Puerto Rico)
- Running time: 102 minutes
- Country: Puerto Rico
- Languages: English; Spanish (subtitled)
- Budget: $50,000

Under My Nails is a Puerto Rican erotic crime thriller film directed by Ari Maniel Cruz, and written, produced and starting Kisha Tikina Burgos. It also stars actor Antonio Pantojas. The film's title refers to its primary protagonist's occupation as a nail salon tech. It is set in New York City, New York, United States.

== Summary ==
Solimar, a Puerto Rican salon employee, is caught between her increasing desire towards her Dominican neighbor Roberto and the suspicion that he violently murdered his Haitian wife.

== Honours ==
Award	Category	Nominee	Result
2011 San Juan International Film Festival	Special Jury Selection	Ari Maniel Cruz	Won
2011 San Juan International Film Festival	Best Actress	Kisha Tikina Burgos	Won
2012 New York International Latino Film Festival	Best U.S. Feature	Ari Maniel Cruz	Won
2012 Muestra Internacional de Cine de Santo Domingo	Special Jury Mention	Ari Maniel Cruz	Won
2012 Cine Las Americas International Film Festival	Best Individual Performance	Kisha Tikina Burgos	Won
