= While Waiting for Godot =

- Written by: Samuel Beckett
- Directed by: Rudi Azank
- Starring: Rudi Azank; Ron Shelly; Molly Densmore; J Moliere; Stephen Kaiser-Pendergrast
- Country of origin: United States
- Original language: English

Production
- Producer: Kickstarter
- Cinematography: Ron Shelly & Rudi Azank
- Editor: Rudi Azank
- Running time: 5 min. (eps), 40 min. (seasons)
- Budget: $4,000

Original release
- Release: 2013

While Waiting for Godot is a web series adaptation of Samuel Beckett’s play En Attendant Godot. It is the winner of Best Cinematography at the 2014 Rome Web Awards, and an Official Selection of the 2014 Miami Web Fest.

The screenplay is based on a 2013 translation (by director Rudi Azank), "in order to restore the language of Beckett’s more risqué original French script (the English script of the play has always been heavily censored). Also more present in the original manuscript are strong Vaudevillian and Jewish aspects of Didi and Gogo, the two lead characters, and a more 'gutter-talk' based banter between Beckett's homeless protagonists.

== Plot ==
Two tramps, while waiting, are prompted by text message to roam modern-day New York City due to Godot's indecisiveness about where to meet. They eventually encounter an aristocrat, Pozzo, and her slave, Lucky.

== Cast ==
- Rudi Azank as Didi
- Ran Shelomi as Gogo
- Jenel Moliere as Pozzo
- Molly Densmore as Lucky
- Stephen Kaiser-Pendergrast as Steven / Stefan

== Critical reception ==
ComedyTVisDead.com praised the series calling it “wonderfully unique, surreal and darkly humorous...It’s bringing classic theatre to the 21st century audience with a great deal of creativity and confidence. This could so easily have been simply a filmed play, but the neat little additions the show’s creators have added on have made this a truly brilliant show.” The Poughkeepsie Journal remarked “through his own vision of the modern urban impoverished, Azank emphasizes the humanity of Godot and makes it timely."

Adrian McCoy (Pittsburgh Post-Gazette) said of the show, “While Waiting for Godot adds unexpected elements, such as a funny line followed by a drum roll and laugh track, mysterious text messages and a great soundtrack, a modern layer of social commentary -- specifically the issue of urban homelessness -- it incorporates real images of life on the street, giving it a gritty documentary feel at times. The camera pans through streets lined with homeless people sleeping, sitting, going nowhere, just like the play's characters.”

"Azank's updating does in fact work; it's neither heavy-handed nor ill-conceived as so many updates of scripts often are, and as a filmed work with the actual backdrop of the city behind the cast, the changes agree with the setting. It's unusual to see GODOT with actual background and physical context that's not sparse, and the grounding in a very real, though altered-by-the-camera, New York changes the viewer's perspective entirely if familiar with the stage version - the absurdism is suddenly anchored in reality, making it seem perhaps less unreal than it normally does."
