= Vladimir (Waiting for Godot) =

Main character in Samuel Beckett's Waiting for Godot

Vladimir is one of the two main characters from Samuel Beckett's Waiting for Godot. In the play, the other main character, Estragon, calls him Didi, while a boy calls him Mister Albert. Vladimir, like Estragon, is a tramp.

== Personality ==
The "optimist" (and, as Beckett put it, "the major character"^{1}) of Godot, he represents the intellectual side of the two main characters (in contrast to his companion Estragon's earthy simplicity). One explanation of this intellectualism is that he was once a philosopher. This would explain his constant references and his attempts to engage Estragon in philosophical and religious debate.

Vladimir is deeply concerned with appearances and goes to great lengths to make sure Estragon behaves so that his own dignity is preserved. He is something of a pack rat: he carries all the food the tramps have (though he never eats himself), and has other (to quote the play) "miscellaneous" junk in various pockets. Another important prop is his bowler hat. He claims that it "hurts" him, and is eventually driven to appropriate Lucky's. After long periods of thought (or whenever he is bored) he fiddles with it and plays with the brim. This hat focus (in terms of being head centred) may be interpreted as being representative of his higher status (see Estragon's boots) and his intellectual nature: because of this, he is usually taller than Estragon, but this is a convention of the theatre and is not written in the play.

Despite this sometimes peevish and obsessive nature, Vladimir would seem to have a carnal side. He suffers from a venereal disease that causes him pain in his genitals and a need to urinate when he laughs. This might indicate a sexual past: he refers to a woman he knew who "had the clap"...although it is unclear whether this is the cause of his current condition or not.

Vladimir has the only social conscience in the play (compare Estragon's misanthropic view of humanity: "People are bloody ignorant apes!"), and it seems that he cares a great deal for the plight of his fellow man: he expresses outrage at Pozzo's treatment of his slave, Lucky, and acts as something of a parental figure to the sometimes childish Estragon. This is not to say Vladimir does not suffer from his own emotional tics. He hates dreams, as they represent a cruel false hope, and he is unable to cope with Estragon's logic, the simplicity of which throws him off. He also does not suffer fools well: Pozzo's decadence and Estragon's crudeness give him much cause for indignation.

== Memory ==
Unlike all the other characters, Vladimir has a sense of the passage of time (only he says he remembers the events of Act I, although it is possible Lucky might recall them: see Lucky and Vladimir). However, he considers his memory unreliable because it can never be corroborated, due to Estragon's memory issues. At the end of the play, it is he who realizes the futile cycle that all of them have fallen into (see second quote). However, he rejects this realization when he finds that it is almost unbearable to live with ("I can't go on!"), and forces himself to dismiss it ("What have I said?"). He resolves to go on waiting for Godot.

== Appearance ==
Information about his appearance is decidedly scant: he walks in "short stiff strides, legs wide apart," and is heavier than Estragon (which gives little information since there is no description of Estragon's weight to use as a reference). It tends to be the convention in most productions, however, that he is tall and lanky, while Estragon is short and squat. He has been portrayed by many notable actors, including Burgess Meredith (with Zero Mostel as Estragon) and - in one rather notorious version of the play - Steve Martin (with Robin Williams as Estragon), Patrick Stewart opposite Ian McKellen, and Alex Winter (opposite Keanu Reeves).

== Quotations ==
The following are notable lines in the part of Vladimir:

Hand in hand from the top of the Eiffel Tower, among the first. We were respectable in those days. Now it's too late. They wouldn't even let us up.

— Waiting for Godot, Act I

Was I sleeping, while the others suffered? Am I sleeping now? Tomorrow, when I wake, or think I do, what shall I say of today? That with Estragon my friend, at this place, until the fall of night, I waited for Godot? That Pozzo passed, with his carrier, and that he spoke to us? Probably. But in all that what truth will there be? (Estragon, having struggled with his boots in vain, is dozing off again. Vladimir looks at him.) He'll know nothing. He'll tell me about the blows he received and I'll give him a carrot.

— Waiting for Godot, Act II

Let us not waste our time in idle discourse! Let us do something, while we have the chance! It is not every day that we are needed. Not indeed that we personally are needed. Others would meet the case equally well, if not better. To all mankind they were addressed, those cries for help still ringing in our ears! But at this place, at this moment of time, all mankind is us, whether we like it or not. Let us make the most of it, before it is too late! Let us represent worthily for once the foul brood to which a cruel fate consigned us! What do you say? It is true that when with folded arms we weigh the pros and cons we are no less a credit to our species. The tiger bounds to the help of his congeners without the least reflection, or else he slinks away into the depths of the thickets. But that is not the question. What are we doing here, that is the question. And we are blessed in this, that we happen to know the answer. Yes, in this immense confusion one thing alone is clear. We are waiting for Godot to come—

— Waiting for Godot, Act II

We wait. We are bored. No, don't protest, we are bored to death, there's no denying it. Good. A diversion comes along and what do we do? We let it go to waste. Come, let's get to work! In an instant all will vanish and we'll be alone once more, in the midst of nothingness!

— Waiting for Godot, Act II

== See also ==
- Estragon
- Pozzo
- Lucky
- Waiting for Godot
- Antihero

== Notes ==
^1 "When Bert Lahr as Estragon in the American production insisted he was 'top banana' and warned Tom Ewell as Vladimir, 'don't crowd me,' the balance of the play was disturbed. Alan Schneider reported Beckett's response, 'Beckett assumes Vladimir is his major character. He was upset that the play was taken away from his major character.' - from Beckett in the Theatre, by Dougland McMillan and Martha Fehsenfeld
