= Estragon =

One of the two main characters in Waiting for Godot

Estragon (affectionately Gogo; he tells Pozzo his name is Adam) is one of the two main characters from Samuel Beckett's Waiting for Godot. His name is the French word for tarragon.

== Personality ==
=== The impulsive misanthrope ===
Estragon represents the impulsive, simplistic side of the two main characters, much in contrast to his companion Vladimir's careful intellectualism and verbosity. He cares little for appearances, and is mostly concerned with eating and sleeping (much to Vladimir's chagrin). Due to his pessimistic outlook on life, he has abandoned all hope of any alleviation from their suffering, and regards "Godot" suspiciously.

This is perhaps because Estragon has far more to worry about. Of the two, Estragon suffers the most physically. He is kicked by Lucky, takes numerous pratfalls, and is beaten by a gang of thugs every night. He also has great difficulty with his boots. In the first act, they do not fit and cause him pain. At the end of the act, he leaves them on the side of the road in disgust. In the second act, he finds them in the same place, now mysteriously fitting him. This boot focus (in terms of the character being foot centred) may be interpreted as being representative of his lower status (see Vladimir's hat) and his "earthy" nature (e.g. his love of carrots, radishes, etc.).

Estragon has a misanthropic view of humanity: he considers people to be "ignorant apes" and seems to want them to leave him alone. However, he is very attached to Vladimir (despite occasionally bickering with him): he needs protection, and Vladimir provides it. Estragon is often seen as the child to Vladimir's adult, and as such looks for parental security in him.

=== The poet ===
Estragon should not, however, be written off as merely a childish simpleton. He easily matches Vladimir in verbal melee (he delivers the ultimate insult in calling Vladimir a "Critic!"). He also shows an artistic side, and even claims to have once been a poet. His brief, but evocative, monologue about the "maps of the Holy Land" is very poetic in nature. He can even quote Shelley (with a slight alteration):

Excerpt from Shelley's poem:

"Art thou pale for weariness/Of climbing heaven and gazing on the earth..."

Estragon's play on it:

"Pale for weariness...Of climbing heaven and gazing on the likes of us."

== Appearance ==
Estragon is given perhaps the most minimal description in the play. He is only described as wearing "rags", walking with a limp (that eventually wears off) and being lighter than Vladimir. Because of his rather gluttonous nature, however, he is often played as being short and slightly fat (in comparison to the often tall and lanky Vladimir). His clothes are usually a bit dirtier than Vladimir's as well, and seem to be in far worse condition. This interpretation is best attributed to his total lack of restraint and inhibitions (diving for food, sleeping in ditches, etc.).

Many famous actors have taken on the role (especially those of the aforementioned body type), notably Bert Lahr, Sir Ian McKellen, Robin Williams (with Steve Martin as Vladimir), and Keanu Reeves (with Alex Winter as Vladimir). Beckett is even said to have wanted Marlon Brando in one production (with Buster Keaton as Vladimir).

== See also ==
- Vladimir
- Pozzo
- Lucky
- Waiting for Godot
- Anti-hero
