= Waiting for Godot =

Play by Samuel Beckett

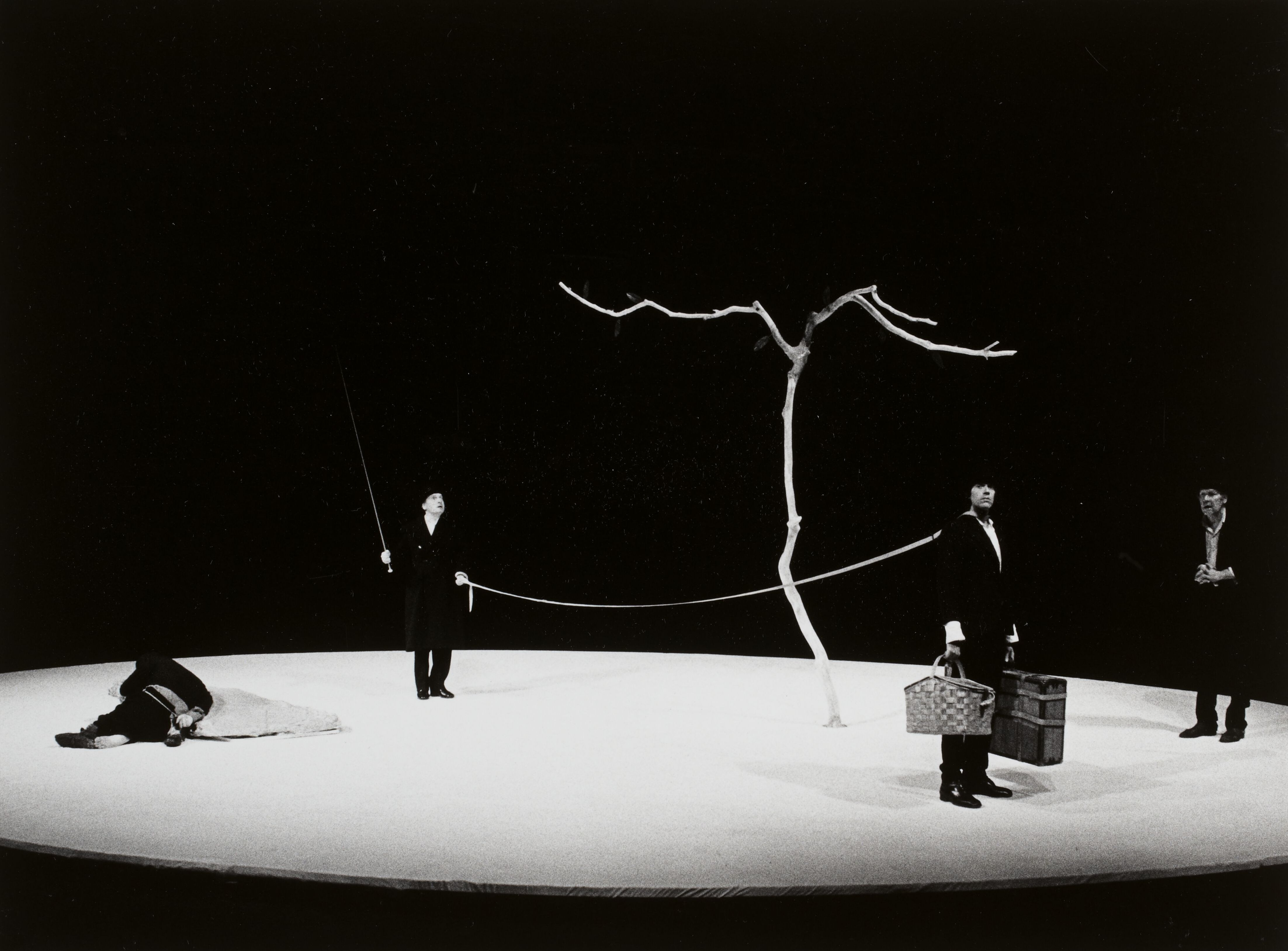
- Scene from the 1978 production directed by Otomar Krejča for the Festival d'Avignon
- Original language: French
- Written by: Samuel Beckett
- Characters: Vladimir; Estragon; Pozzo; Lucky; A boy
- Genre: Tragicomedy (play)

Premiere
- Date: 5 January 1953; 73 years ago
- Place: Théâtre de Babylone, Paris

Waiting for Godot (Note: /ˈɡɒdoʊ/ GOD-oh or /ɡəˈdoʊ/ gə-DOH) is a play by Irish playwright and author Samuel Beckett. It was written (1948–1949), first published (1952), and first performed (1953) in French as En attendant Godot. The play is Beckett's own English-language adaptation of the original. Subtitled as a "tragicomedy in two acts", it is his best-known literary work and regarded by critics as "one of the most enigmatic plays of modern literature". In a 1998 public poll conducted by London's Royal National Theatre, Waiting for Godot was voted as "the most significant English-language play of the 20th century".

In Waiting for Godot, the two main characters, Vladimir (Didi) and Estragon (Gogo), spend their days waiting for someone named Godot, who they believe will provide them with salvation. They pass the time with conversations, physical routines, and philosophical musings, but Godot never arrives. They encounter three other characters: Pozzo; his servant, Lucky; and a young boy. As the play unfolds, the repetition of actions and dialogue suggests the cyclical nature of their lives, and though Godot is promised for "tomorrow", he never appears in the play, leaving the characters in a state of existential uncertainty.

The original French text was composed between 9 October 1948 and 29 January 1949. The premiere, directed by Roger Blin, was at the Théâtre de Babylone, Paris, in January 1953. The English-language version of the play premiered in London in 1955. Though there is only one scene throughout both acts, the play is known for its numerous themes, religious, philosophical, classical, social, psychoanalytical, and biographical. Beckett said Caspar David Friedrich's 1819 painting Two Men Contemplating the Moon was a major inspiration for the play. Dramatist Martin Esslin said Waiting for Godot was part of a broader literary movement known as the Theatre of the Absurd, which was first proposed by Albert Camus.

The play has received widespread acclaim. Due to its popularity, significance, and cultural importance to modern literature, Waiting for Godot has often been adapted for stage, operas, musicals, television, and theatrical performances across most of Europe and the Americas. As one of the foundational works of modern absurdist theatre, the play remains widely studied in academic and literary circles.

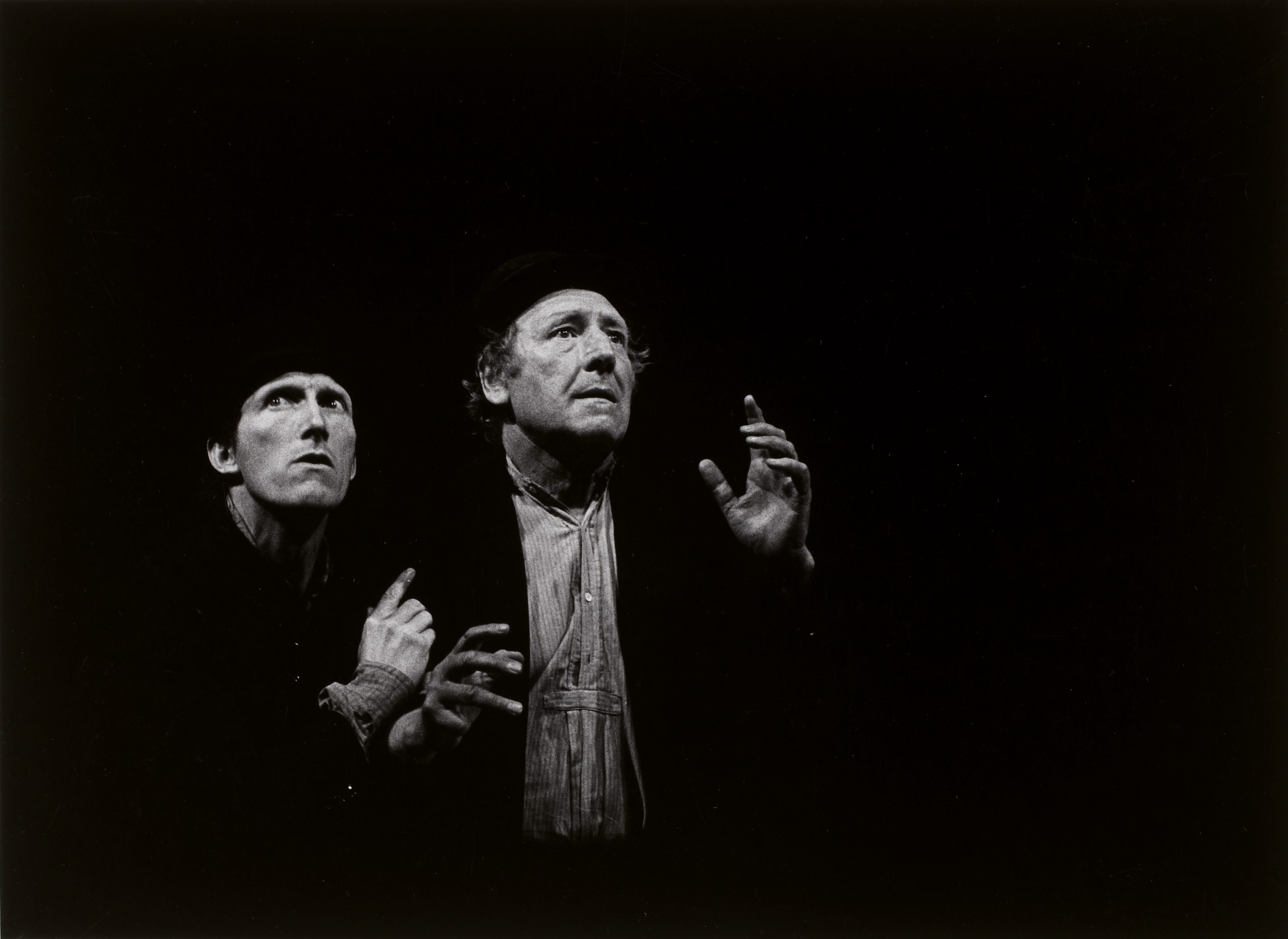
Rufus as Estragon and Georges Wilson as Vladimir in the 1978 adaptation of the play

== Plot ==
=== Act I ===
The play opens with two bedraggled acquaintances, Vladimir and Estragon, meeting by a leafless tree. Estragon notifies Vladimir of his most recent troubles: he spent the previous night lying in a ditch and received a beating from a number of anonymous assailants. The duo discuss various matters at length, none of any apparent significance, and it is eventually revealed that they are awaiting a man named Godot. They are not certain if they have ever met Godot, nor if he will even arrive.

Subsequently, an imperious traveller named Pozzo, along with his silent slave Lucky, arrives and pauses to converse with Vladimir and Estragon. Lucky is bound by a rope held by Pozzo, who forces Lucky to carry his heavy bags and physically punishes him if he deems Lucky's movements too lethargic. Pozzo says he is on the way to the market, at which he intends to sell Lucky for profit. Following Pozzo's command "Think!", the otherwise mute Lucky performs a sudden dance and monologue: a torrent of academic-sounding nonsensical phrases, albeit carefully constructed to deliver "poetic rationality". Lucky's speech seems to cryptically reference the play's absurdist themes. Pozzo and Lucky depart, leaving the bewildered Estragon and Vladimir to continue their wait for the absent Godot.

Eventually, a boy arrives and tells Vladimir and Estragon that he is a messenger from Godot, and that Godot will not be arriving tonight, but surely tomorrow. Vladimir asks for descriptions of Godot, receiving only extremely brief or vague answers from the boy, who soon exits. Vladimir and Estragon then announce that they will also leave, but they remain onstage without moving.

=== Act II ===
Vladimir and Estragon are again waiting near the tree, which has grown several leaves since Act 1. They are still awaiting Godot. Lucky and Pozzo eventually reappear, but not as they were previously. Pozzo has become blind and Lucky is now fully mute. Pozzo cannot recall having met Vladimir and Estragon, who themselves cannot agree on when they last saw the travellers. Lucky and Pozzo exit shortly after their spirited encounter, leaving Vladimir and Estragon to go on waiting.

Soon after, the boy reappears to again report that Godot will not be coming tonight, but surely tomorrow. The boy says he has not met Vladimir and Estragon before and is not the same boy who spoke to Vladimir yesterday, which causes Vladimir to burst into a rage at the child, demanding that the boy remember him the next day so as to avoid repeating this encounter once more. After the boy exits, Vladimir and Estragon consider suicide, but they do not have a rope with which to hang themselves. They decide to leave and return the day after with a rope, but again they merely remain motionless as the scene fades to black.

== Characters ==
Beckett refrained from elaborating on the characters beyond what he had written in the play. He once recalled that when Sir Ralph Richardson "wanted the low-down on Pozzo, his home address and curriculum vitae, and seemed to make the forthcoming of this and similar information the condition of his condescending to illustrate the part of Vladimir ... I told him that all I knew about Pozzo was in the text, that if I had known more I would have put it in the text, and that was true also of the other characters."

=== Vladimir and Estragon ===
Appearance

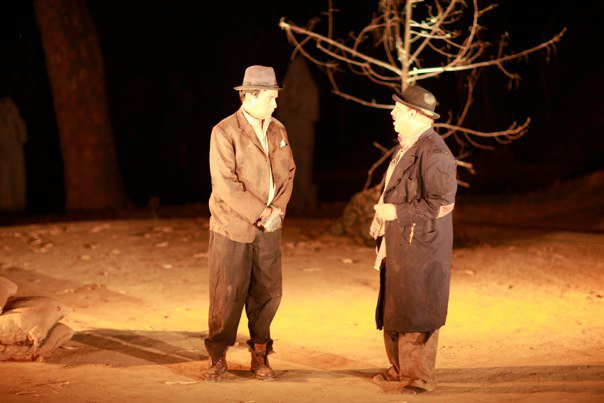
Vladimir and Estragon (The Doon School, India, 2010)

When Beckett started writing he did not have a visual image of Vladimir and Estragon. They are never referred to as tramps in the text, though they are often performed in tramps' costumes. Roger Blin said: "Beckett heard their voices, but he couldn't describe his characters to me. [He said]: 'The only thing I'm sure of is that they're wearing bowlers.'" "The bowler hat was of course de rigueur for men in many social contexts when Beckett was growing up in Foxrock, and [his father] William Beckett commonly wore one." The play does indicate that the clothes worn at least by Estragon are shabby. When told by Vladimir that he should have been a poet, Estragon says he was, gestures to his rags, and asks if it is not obvious.

There are no physical descriptions of either character, but the text indicates that Vladimir is the heavier of the pair, as revealed in the contemplation-of-suicide scene. The bowlers and other broadly comic aspects of their personae have reminded modern audiences of Laurel and Hardy, who occasionally played tramps in their films. In The Comic Mind: Comedy and the Movies. Gerald Mast wrote, "The hat-passing game in Waiting for Godot and Lucky's inability to think without his hat on are two obvious Beckett derivations from Laurel and Hardy – a substitution of form for essence, covering for reality". Their "blather", which includes Hiberno-English idioms, indicates that they are Irish.

Physicality and beliefs Vladimir stands through most of the play, while Estragon sits numerous times and even dozes off. "Estragon is inert and Vladimir restless." Vladimir looks at the sky and muses on religious or philosophical matters. Estragon "belongs to the stone", preoccupied with mundane things such as what he can get to eat and how to ease his physical aches and pains; he is direct, intuitive. The monotonous, ritualistic means by which Estragon continuously sits upon the stone may be likened to Winnie's constant nail filing in Beckett's play Happy Days; both actions can be seen as representing the slow, deliberate erosion of the characters' lives. Estragon finds it hard to remember but can recall certain things when prompted, e.g., when Vladimir asks: "Do you remember the Gospels?" Estragon tells Vladimir about the coloured maps of the Holy Land and that he planned to honeymoon by the Dead Sea; it is his short-term memory that is poorest and suggests that he may in fact have dementia. Al Alvarez writes: "But perhaps Estragon's forgetfulness is the cement binding their relationship together. He continually forgets, Vladimir continually reminds him; between them they pass the time." Estragon's forgetfulness also affords Beckett a certain narrative utility, allowing his mundane, empty conversations with Vladimir to continue seamlessly. They have been together for fifty years but when asked by Pozzo they do not reveal their actual ages. Vladimir's life is not without its discomforts too but he is the more resilient of the pair. "Vladimir's pain is primarily mental anguish, which would thus account for his voluntary exchange of his hat for Lucky's, thus signifying Vladimir's symbolic desire for another person's thoughts." To some, these characterizations represent the act of thinking or mental state (Vladimir) and physical things or the body (Estragon). This is depicted by Vladimir's continuous attention to his hat and Estragon's to his boots. The two characters are temperamentally opposite, but are both essential: Vladimir's metaphysical musings are balanced by Estragon's physical demands.

Interpretations The above characterizations, particularly those about their existential situation, are also demonstrated in one of the play's recurring themes, which is sleep. Twice, Estragon falls asleep and has nightmares, about which he wants to tell Vladimir when he wakes. The latter refuses, since he cannot tolerate the sense of entrapment the dreamer experiences. This idea of entrapment supports the view that the play's setting may be understood more clearly as a dreamlike landscape, or, a form of Purgatory, from which neither man can escape. One interpretation noted the link between the two characters' experiences and the way they represent them: the impotence in Estragon's nightmare and Vladimir's predicament of waiting as his companion sleeps. It is also said that sleep and impatience allow the spectators to distinguish the two characters: that sleep expresses Estragon's focus on his sensations while Vladimir's restlessness shows his focus on his thoughts. This is indicative of what some call a pattern of duality in the play. In the case of the protagonists, the duality involves the body and the mind, making the characters complementary.

Nicknames

Throughout the play the couple refer to each other by the pet names "Didi" and "Gogo", although the boy addresses Vladimir as "Mister Albert". Beckett originally intended to call Estragon "Lévy" but when Pozzo questions him he gives his name as "Magrégor, André" and also responds to "Catulle" in French or "Catullus" in the first Faber edition. This became "Adam" in the American edition. Beckett's only explanation was that he was "fed up with Catullus".

Characterisation reception

Vivian Mercier described Waiting for Godot as a play which "has achieved a theoretical impossibility – a play in which nothing happens, that yet keeps audiences glued to their seats. What's more, since the second act is a subtly different reprise of the first, he has written a play in which nothing happens, twice." Mercier once questioned Beckett on the language used by the pair: "It seemed to me ... he made Didi and Gogo sound as if they had earned PhDs. 'How do you know they hadn't?' was his reply. They clearly have known better times, such as a visit to the Eiffel Tower and grape-harvesting by the Rhône; this is about all either has to say about their pasts, save for Estragon's claim to have been a poet, an explanation Estragon provides to Vladimir for his destitution. In the first stage production, which Beckett oversaw, both are "more shabby-genteel than ragged ... Vladimir at least is capable of being scandalised ... on a matter of etiquette when Estragon begs for chicken bones or money."

=== Pozzo and Lucky ===
Characterisation

Pozzo and Lucky have been together for 60 years. Pozzo controls Lucky by means of an extremely long rope, which he jerks and tugs if Lucky is the least bit slow.

Lucky appears to be the subservient member of their relationship, at least initially, carrying out every task that Pozzo bids him to do without question, portraying a form of "dog-like devotion" to his master. He struggles with a heavy suitcase, falling on a number of occasions, only to be helped and held up by Estragon and Vladimir.

It has been contended that "Pozzo and Lucky are simply Didi and Gogo writ large", unbalanced as their relationship is. However, Pozzo's dominance is superficial; "upon closer inspection, it becomes evident that Lucky always possessed more influence in the relationship, for he danced, and more importantly, thought – not as a service, but in order to fill a vacant need of Pozzo: he committed all of these acts for Pozzo. As such, since the first appearance of the duo, the true slave had always been Pozzo." Pozzo credits Lucky with having given him all the culture, refinement, and ability to reason that he possesses. His rhetoric has been learned by rote. Pozzo's "party piece" on the sky is a clear example: as his memory crumbles, he finds himself unable to continue under his own steam.

Emphasis of contrasts

Little is learned about Pozzo besides the fact that he is on his way to the fair to sell his slave, Lucky. From Beckett's own life experiences in Ireland and wartime France, commentators such as Hugh Kenner have identified Pozzo as representing German behaviour in occupied France, or alternatively as a bullying and conceited Protestant Ascendancy landlord. When translating his original French dialogue into English, Beckett took pains to introduce Irish idiom (specifically, Dubliners' idiom): Pozzo's pipe is made by Kapp and Peterson, Dublin's best-known tobacconists (which he refers to as a "briar" but which Estragon calls by the dialect word dudeen). Not only is his Hiberno-English text more colourful than the French original, but it emphasizes the differences in the characters' social standing. Pozzo confesses to a poor memory but it is more a result of an abiding self-absorption. "Pozzo is a character who has to overcompensate. That's why he overdoes things ... and his overcompensation has to do with a deep insecurity in him. These were things Beckett said, psychological terms he used." Beckett's advice to the American director Alan Schneider was: "[Pozzo] is a hypomaniac and the only way to play him is to play him mad."

"In his [English] translation ... Beckett struggled to retain the French atmosphere as much as possible, so that he delegated all the English names and places to Lucky, whose own name, he thought, suggested such a correlation".

Characterisation reception

Lucky speaks only once in the play and it is in response to Pozzo's order to "think" for Estragon and Vladimir. The ostensibly abstract philosophical meanderings supplied to the audience by Lucky during his speech have been described as "a flood of completely meaningless gibberish" by Martin Esslin in his essay, "The Theatre of the Absurd". Esslin suggests that this seemingly involuntary, philosophical spouting is an example of the actor's working "against the dialogue rather than with it", providing grounds for Esslin's claims that the "fervor of delivery" in the play must "stand in a dialectical contrast to the pointlessness of the meaning of the lines".

Jean Martin, who originated the role of Lucky in Paris in 1953, spoke to a doctor named Marthe Gautier, who was working at the Pitié-Salpêtrière Hospital. Martin asked if she knew of a physiological reason that would explain Lucky's voice as it was written in the text. Gautier suggested Parkinson's disease, which, she said, "begins with a trembling, which gets more and more noticeable, until later the patient can no longer speak without the voice shaking". Martin began incorporating this idea into his rehearsals. Beckett and the director may not have been completely convinced, but they expressed no objections. When Martin mentioned to the playwright that he was "playing Lucky as if he were suffering from Parkinson's", Beckett responded by saying "Yes, of course", and mentioning that his own mother had Parkinson's.

When Beckett was asked why Lucky was so named, he replied, "I suppose he is lucky to have no more expectations".

=== The Boy ===
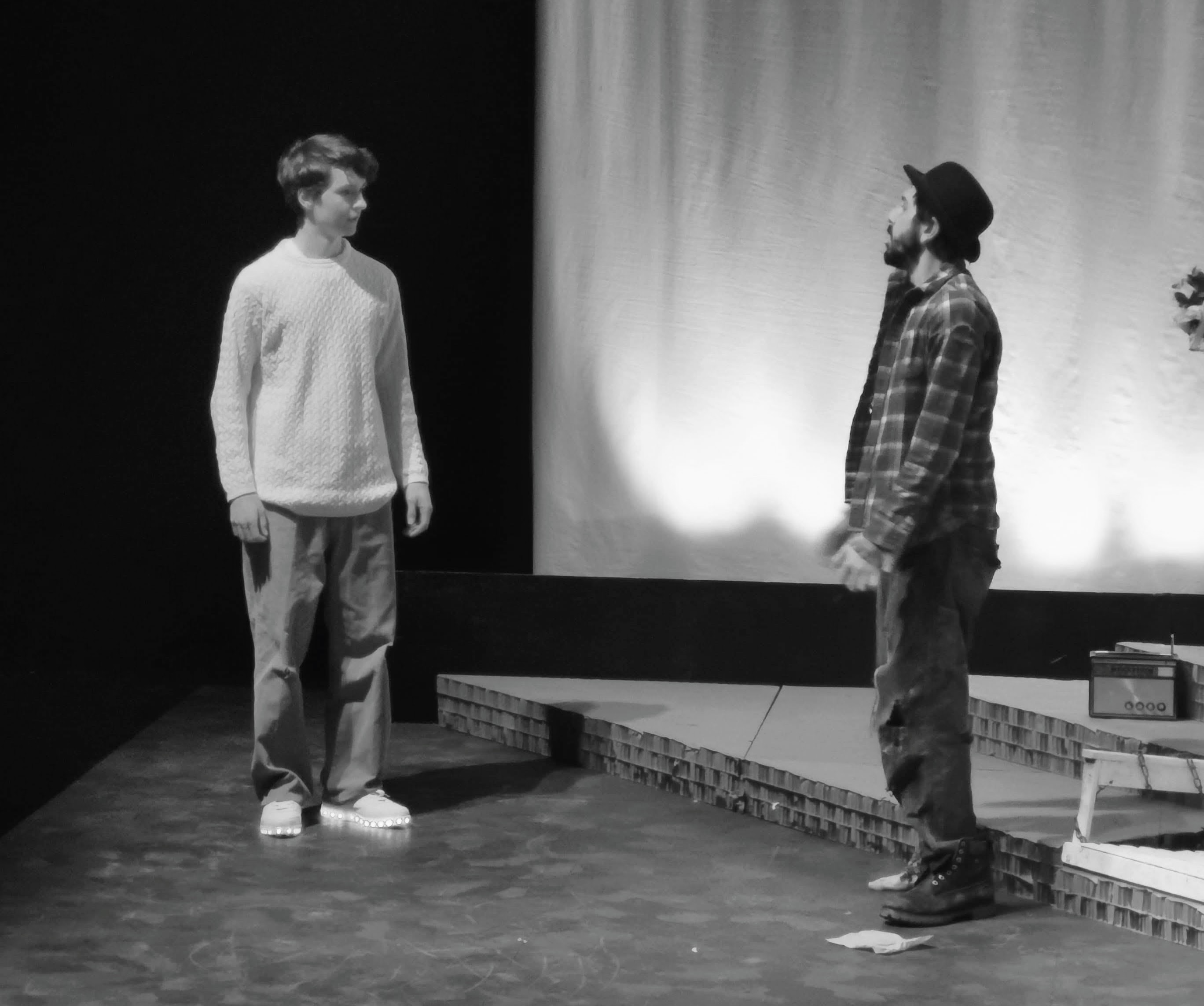
Estragon and the boy (University of Chicago, 2020)

The cast list specifies only one boy.

The boy in Act I, a local lad, assures Vladimir that this is the first time he has seen him. He says he was not there the previous day. He confirms he works for Mr. Godot as a goatherd. His brother, whom Godot beats, is a shepherd. Godot feeds both of them and allows them to sleep in his hayloft.

The boy in Act II also assures Vladimir that it was not he who called upon them the day before. He insists that this too is his first visit. When Vladimir asks what Godot does, the boy tells him, "He does nothing, sir." We also learn he has a white beard – possibly, the boy is not certain. This boy also has a brother who it seems is sick but there is no clear evidence to suggest that his brother is the boy who came in Act I or the one who came the day before that.

Whether the boy from Act I is the same boy from Act II or not, both boys are polite yet timid. In the first act, the boy, despite claiming to have arrived while Pozzo and Lucky are still about, does not announce himself until after Pozzo and Lucky leave, saying to Vladimir and Estragon that he waited for the other two to leave out of fear of the two men and of Pozzo's whip; the boy does not claim to arrive early enough in Act II to see either Lucky or Pozzo. In both acts, the boy seems hesitant to speak very much, saying mostly "Yes Sir" or "No Sir", and winds up exiting by running away.

=== Godot ===
The identity of Godot has been the subject of much debate. "When Colin Duckworth asked Beckett point-blank whether Pozzo was Godot, the author replied: 'No. It is just implied in the text, but it's not true.'"

Possible inspirations

Deirdre Bair says that though "Beckett will never discuss the implications of the title", she suggests two stories that both may have at least partially inspired it. The first is that because feet are a recurring theme in the play, Beckett has said the title was suggested to him by the slang French term for boot: "godillot, godasse". The second story, according to Bair, is that Beckett once encountered a group of spectators at the French Tour de France bicycle race, who told him "Nous attendons Godot" – they were waiting for a competitor whose name was Godot.

"Beckett said to Peter Woodthorpe that he regretted calling the absent character 'Godot', because of all the theories involving God to which this had given rise." "I also told [Ralph] Richardson that if by Godot I had meant God I would [have] said God, and not Godot. This seemed to disappoint him greatly." That said, Beckett did once concede, "It would be fatuous of me to pretend that I am not aware of the meanings attached to the word 'Godot', and the opinion of many that it means 'God'. But you must remember – I wrote the play in French, and if I did have that meaning in my mind, it was somewhere in my unconscious and I was not overtly aware of it." (Note: the French word for 'God' is 'Dieu'.) However, "Beckett has often stressed the strong unconscious impulses that partly control his writing; he has even spoken of being 'in a trance' when he writes." While Beckett stated he originally had no knowledge of Balzac's play Mercadet ou le faiseur, whose character Godeau has an identical-sounding name and is involved in a similar situation, it has been suggested he may have been instead influenced by The Lovable Cheat, a minor adaptation of Mercadet featuring Buster Keaton, whose works Beckett had admired, and whom he later sought out for Film.

Unlike elsewhere in Beckett's work, no bicycle appears in this play, but Hugh Kenner in his essay "The Cartesian Centaur" reports that Beckett once, when asked about the meaning of Godot, mentioned "a veteran racing cyclist, bald, a 'stayer', recurrent placeman in town-to-town and national championships, Christian name elusive, surname Godeau, pronounced, of course, no differently from Godot." Waiting for Godot is clearly not about track cycling, but it is said that Beckett himself did wait for French cyclist Roger Godeau (1920–2000; a professional cyclist from 1943 to 1961), outside the velodrome in Roubaix.

Of the two boys who work for Godot only one appears safe from beatings, "Beckett said, only half-jokingly, that one of Estragon's feet was saved".

Pronunciation

The name "Godot" is pronounced in Britain and Ireland with the emphasis on the first syllable, /ˈɡɒdoʊ/ GOD-oh; in North America it is usually pronounced with an emphasis on the second syllable, /ɡəˈdoʊ/ gə-DOH. Beckett himself said the emphasis should be on the first syllable, and that the North American pronunciation is a mistake. Georges Borchardt, Beckett's literary agent, and who represents Beckett's literary estate, has always pronounced "Godot" in the French manner, with equal emphasis on both syllables. Borchardt checked with Beckett's nephew, Edward, who told him his uncle pronounced it that way as well. The 1956 Broadway production split the difference by having Vladimir pronounce "Godot" with equal stress on both syllables (goh-doh) and Estragon pronounce it with the accent on the second syllable (g'doh).

== Setting ==
There is only one scene throughout both acts. Two men are waiting on a country road by a tree. The men are of unspecified origin, though it is clear that they are not English by nationality since they refer to currency as francs, and tell derisive jokes about the English – and in English-language productions the pair are traditionally played with Irish accents. The script calls for Estragon to sit on a low mound but in practice – as in Beckett's own 1975 German production – this is usually a stone. In the first act the tree is bare. In the second, a few leaves have appeared despite the script specifying that it is the next day. The minimal description calls to mind "the idea of the lieu vague, a location which should not be particularised".

Other clues about the location can be found in the dialogue. In Act I, Vladimir turns toward the auditorium and describes it as a bog. In Act II, Vladimir again motions to the auditorium and notes that there is "Not a soul in sight." When Estragon rushes toward the back of the stage in Act II, Vladimir scolds him, saying that "There's no way out there." Also in Act II, Vladimir comments that their surroundings look nothing like the Macon country, and Estragon states that he's lived his whole life "Here! In the Cackon country!"

Alan Schneider once suggested putting the play on in the round – Pozzo has been described as a ringmaster – but Beckett dissuaded him: "I don't in my ignorance agree with the round and feel Godot needs a very closed box." He even contemplated at one point having a "faint shadow of bars on stage floor" but, in the end, decided against this level of what he called "explicitation". In Beckett's 1975 Schiller Theater production in Berlin, there are times when Didi and Gogo appear to bounce off something "like birds trapped in the strands of [an invisible] net", in James Knowlson's description.

== Interpretations ==
"Because the play is so stripped down, so elemental, it invites all kinds of social and political and religious interpretation", wrote Normand Berlin in a tribute to the play in autumn 1999, "with Beckett himself placed in different schools of thought, different movements and 'isms'. The attempts to pin him down have not been successful, but the desire to do so is natural when we encounter a writer whose minimalist art reaches for bedrock reality. 'Less' forces us to look for 'more', and the need to talk about Godot and about Beckett has resulted in a steady outpouring of books and articles."

Throughout Waiting for Godot, the audience may encounter religious, philosophical, classical, psychoanalytical and biographical – especially wartime – references. There are ritualistic aspects and elements taken directly from vaudeville, and there is a danger in making more of these than what they are: that is, merely structural conveniences, avatars into which the writer places his fictional characters. The play "exploits several archetypal forms and situations, all of which lend themselves to both comedy and pathos." Beckett makes this point emphatically in the opening notes to Film: "No truth value attaches to the above, regarded as of merely structural and dramatic convenience." He told critic Lawrence E. Harvey that his "work does not depend on experience – [it is] not a record of experience. Of course you use it."

Beckett tired quickly of "the endless misunderstanding". As far back as 1955, he remarked, "Why people have to complicate a thing so simple I can't make out." He was not forthcoming with anything more than cryptic clues: "Peter Woodthorpe [who played Estragon] remembered asking him one day in a taxi what the play was really about: 'It's all symbiosis, Peter; it's symbiosis,' answered Beckett."

Beckett directed the play for the Schiller-Theater in Berlin in 1975. Although he had overseen many productions, this was the first time that he had taken complete control. Walter Asmus was his conscientious young assistant director. The production was not naturalistic. Beckett explained:

It is a game, everything is a game. When all four of them are lying on the ground, that cannot be handled naturalistically. That has got to be done artificially, balletically. Otherwise everything becomes an imitation, an imitation of reality [...] It should become clear and transparent, not dry. It is a game in order to survive.

Over the years, Beckett realised that much of Godot's success was due to its openness to various readings and that this was not necessarily bad. He sanctioned "one of the most famous mixed-race productions of Godot, performed at the Baxter Theatre in the University of Cape Town, directed by Donald Howarth, with [...] two black actors, John Kani and Winston Ntshona, playing Didi and Gogo; Pozzo, dressed in checked shirt and gumboots reminiscent of an Afrikaner landlord, and Lucky ('a shanty town piece of white trash') were played by two white actors, Bill Flynn and Peter Piccolo [...]. The Baxter production has often been portrayed as if it were an explicitly political production, when in fact it received very little emphasis. What such a reaction showed, however, was that, although the play can in no way be taken as a political allegory, there are elements that are relevant to any local situation in which one man is being exploited or oppressed by another."

=== Political ===
"It was seen as an allegory of the Cold War" or of French Resistance to the Germans. Graham Hassell writes, "the intrusion of Pozzo and Lucky [...] seems like nothing more than a metaphor for Ireland's view of mainland Britain, where society has ever been blighted by a greedy ruling élite keeping the working classes passive and ignorant by whatever means."

The play was written shortly after the end of World War II, during which Beckett and his partner were forced to flee occupied Paris to avoid arrest, owing to their affiliation with the French Resistance. After the war, Beckett volunteered for the Red Cross in Saint-Lô, which had been almost completely destroyed during the D-Day fighting. These experiences likely had a severe effect on both Beckett's politics and his views on the prevailing policies of the period. Some academics have theorized that Godot is set during World War II, with Estragon and Vladimir two Jews waiting for Godot to smuggle them out of occupied France.

=== Psychological ===
==== Freudian ====
"Bernard Dukore develops a triadic theory in Didi, Gogo and the absent Godot, based on Sigmund Freud's trinitarian description of the psyche in The Ego and the Id (1923) and the usage of onomastic techniques. Dukore defines the characters by what they lack: the rational Go-go embodies the incomplete ego, the missing pleasure principle: (e)go-(e)go. Di-di (id-id) – who is more instinctual and irrational – is seen as the backward id or subversion of the rational principle. Godot fulfills the function of the superego or moral standards. Pozzo and Lucky are just re-iterations of the main protagonists. Dukore finally sees Beckett's play as a metaphor for the futility of man's existence when salvation is expected from an external entity, and the self is denied introspection."

==== Jungian ====
"The four archetypal personalities or the four aspects of the soul are grouped in two pairs: the ego and the shadow, the persona and the soul's image (animus or anima). The shadow is the container of all our despised emotions repressed by the ego. Lucky, the shadow, serves as the polar opposite of the egocentric Pozzo, prototype of prosperous mediocrity, who incessantly controls and persecutes his subordinate, thus symbolising the oppression of the unconscious shadow by the despotic ego. Lucky's monologue in Act I appears as a manifestation of a stream of repressed unconsciousness, as he is allowed to 'think' for his master. Estragon's name has another connotation, besides that of the aromatic herb, tarragon: "estragon" sounds similar to estrogen, the female hormone (Carter, 130). This prompts us to identify him with the anima, the feminine image of Vladimir's soul. It explains Estragon's propensity for poetry, his sensitivity and dreams, his irrational moods. Vladimir appears as the complementary masculine principle, or perhaps the rational persona of the contemplative type."

=== Philosophical ===
==== Existential ====
Broadly speaking, existentialists hold that everyone must come to terms with certain fundamental questions if they are to take their subjective existences seriously and with intrinsic value—questions such as life, death, the meaning of human existence and the place of God in that existence. By and large, the theories of existentialism assert that conscious reality is very complex and without an "objective" or universally known value: the individual must create value by affirming it and living it, not by simply talking about it or philosophising it in the mind. The play may be seen to touch on all these issues.

Martin Esslin, in his The Theatre of the Absurd (1960), argued that Waiting for Godot was part of a broader literary movement he called the Theatre of the Absurd, a form of theatre that stemmed from the absurdist philosophy of Albert Camus. Absurdism itself is a branch of existentialism, pioneered by Søren Kierkegaard, and posits that, while inherent meaning might exist, human beings are incapable of finding it due to some form of mental or philosophical limitation. Thus, humanity is doomed to be faced with the Absurd, or the absolute absurdity of the existence in lack of intrinsic purpose.

==== Ethical ====
Just after Didi and Gogo have been particularly selfish and callous, the boy comes to say that Godot is not coming. The boy (or pair of boys) may be seen to represent meekness and hope before compassion is consciously excluded by an evolving personality and character, in which case they may be the youthful Pozzo and Lucky. Thus Godot is compassion and fails to arrive every day, as he says he will. No-one is concerned that a boy is beaten. In this interpretation, there is the irony that only by changing their hearts to be compassionate can the characters fixed to the tree move on and cease to have to wait for Godot.

=== Christian ===
Much of the play is steeped in scriptural allusion. The boy from Act I mentions that he and his brother mind Godot's sheep and goats. Much can be read into Beckett's inclusion of the story of the two thieves from Luke 23:39–43 and the ensuing discussion of repentance. It is easy to see the tree as the Christian cross or the tree of life. Some see God and Godot as one and the same. Vladimir's "Christ have mercy upon us!" could be taken as evidence that at least he believes so.

Another, perhaps less conspicuous, potentially religious element is Pozzo's bout with blindness, during which he comes to resemble the biblical figure of Bartimaeus ('The Blind Beggar').

This reading is given further weight early in the first act when Estragon asks Vladimir what he has requested from Godot:

Vladimir: "Oh ... nothing very definite."
Estragon: "A kind of prayer."
Vladimir: "Precisely."
Estragon: "A vague supplication."
Vladimir: "Exactly."

Other explicit Christian elements include repentance, the Gospels, a Saviour, human beings made in God's image, the cross, and Cain and Abel.

According to biographer Anthony Cronin, Beckett "always possessed a Bible, at the end more than one edition, and Bible concordances were always among the reference books on his shelves." Beckett said: "Christianity is a mythology with which I am perfectly familiar so I naturally use it." Cronin argues the biblical references "may be ironic or even sarcastic".

"In answer to a defence counsel question in 1937 (during the libel action brought by his uncle against Oliver St. John Gogarty) as to whether he was a Christian, Jew or atheist, Beckett replied, 'None of the three'". Mary Bryden wrote, "the hypothesised God who emerges from Beckett's texts is one who is both cursed for his perverse absence and cursed for his surveillant presence. He is by turns dismissed, satirised, or ignored, but he, and his tortured son, are never definitively discarded."

=== Autobiographical ===
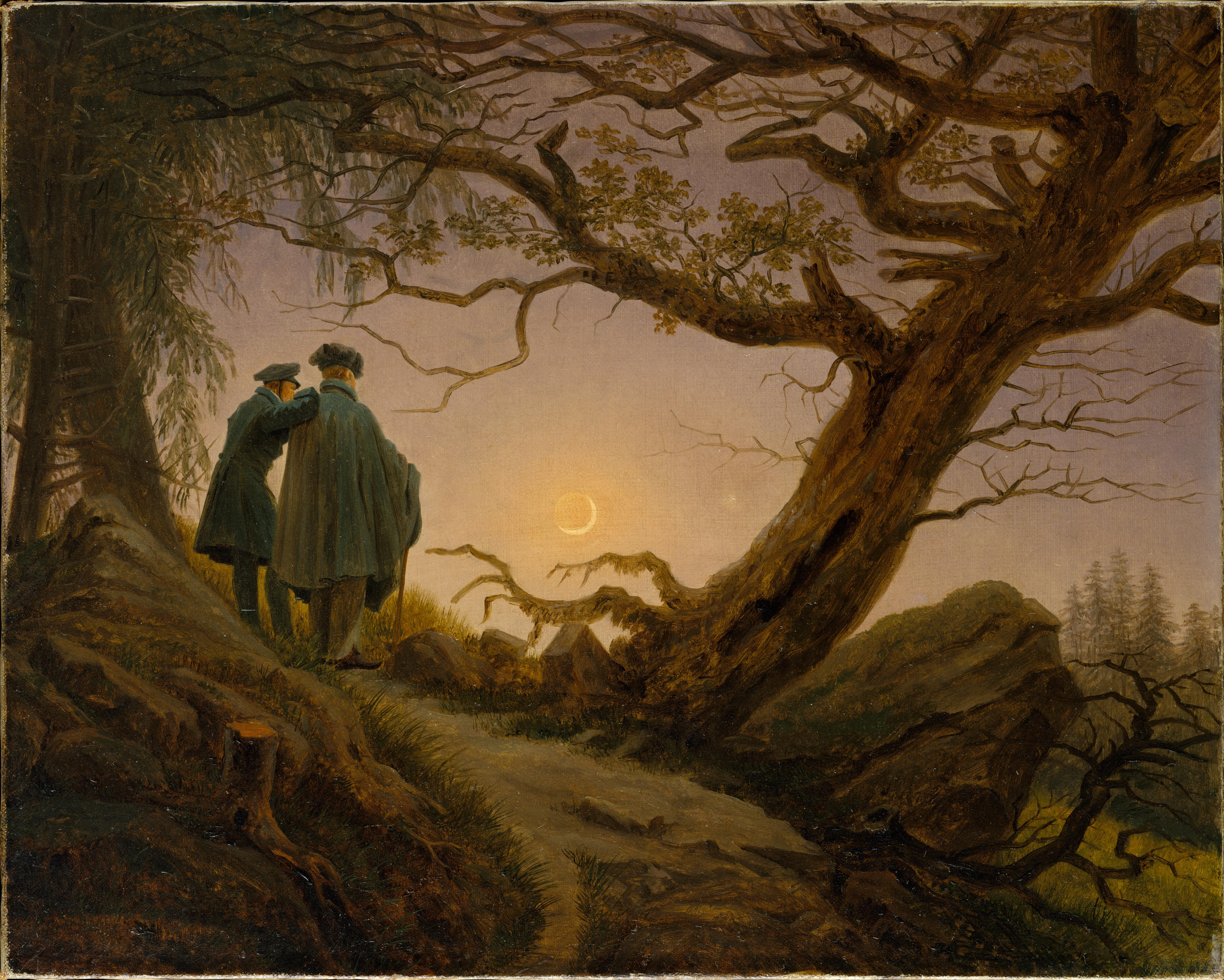
According to Beckett, Caspar David Friedrich's painting Two Men Contemplating the Moon was an inspiration for the play

Waiting for Godot has been described as a "metaphor for the long walk into Roussillon, when Beckett and Suzanne slept in haystacks ... during the day and walked by night ... [or] of the relationship of Beckett to Joyce". Beckett told Ruby Cohn that Caspar David Friedrich's painting Two Men Contemplating the Moon, which he saw on his journey to Germany in 1936, was the source for the play.

=== Sexual ===
Though the sexuality of Vladimir and Estragon is not always considered by critics, some see the two vagabonds as an ageing homosexual couple, who are worn out, with broken spirits, impotent and not engaging sexually any longer. The two appear to be written as a parody of a married couple. Peter Boxall points out that the play features two characters who seem to have shared life together for years; they quarrel, embrace, and are mutually dependent. Beckett was interviewed at the time the play was premiering in New York, and, speaking of his writings and characters in general, Beckett said "I'm working with impotence, ignorance. I don't think impotence has been exploited in the past."

Pozzo and his slave, Lucky, arrive on the scene. Pozzo is a stout man, who wields a whip and holds a rope around Lucky's neck. Some critics have considered that the relationship of these two characters is homosexual and sado-masochistic in nature. Lucky's long speech is a torrent of broken ideas and speculations regarding man, sex, God, and time. It has been said that the play contains little or no sexual hope, this being the play's lament, and the source of the play's humour and comedic tenderness. Norman Mailer wonders if Beckett might be restating the sexual and moral basis of Christianity, that life and strength is found in an adoration of those in the lower depths where God is concealed.

=== Beckett's objection to the casting of female actors ===
Beckett was not open to most interpretative approaches to his work. He famously objected when, in the 1980s, several women's acting companies began to stage the play. "Women don't have prostates", said Beckett, a reference to the fact that Vladimir frequently has to leave the stage to urinate. Florian Illies speculates that Beckett's objection to the casting of women originates in the painting Man and Woman Contemplating the Moon by Caspar David Friedrich: Friedrich's companion piece Two Men Contemplating the Moon was the inspiration for Beckett's play, and apparently he was taken aback when, only later, did he learn that the painting was one of a complementary pair, where the other work's subjects were a man and a woman.

In 1988 a Dutch theatre company, De Haarlemse Toneelschuur, put on a production directed by Matin Van Veldhuizen with all female actors, using a French-to-Dutch translation by Jacoba Van Velde. Beckett brought an unsuccessful lawsuit against the theatre company. "The issue of gender seemed to him to be so vital a distinction for a playwright to make that he reacted angrily, instituting a ban on all productions of his plays in The Netherlands." This ban was short-lived, however.

In 1991 (two years after Beckett's death), a French judge ruled that productions with female casts would not cause excessive damage to Beckett's legacy, and allowed the play to be performed by the all-female cast of the Brut de Beton theater company at the Avignon Festival, although an objection by Beckett's representative had to be read before each performance.

Similarly, an injunction was issued against a theatre in Pontedera, Tuscany, by lawyers for Samuel Beckett's estate who did not want female actors to play Vladimir and Estragon in the play, but in 2006 a court in Rome ruled that the women could play the roles.

At the 1995 Acco Festival, director Nola Chilton staged a production with Daniella Michaeli in the role of Lucky. In 2021, São João National Theatre in Porto, Portugal, staged a version with Maria Leite as Lucky.

The topic of Beckett and his estate preventing female productions of the play is explored in the play Godot Is a Woman, which was staged at the Edinburgh Festival Fringe in 2023 by the theatre company Silent Faces.

== Production history ==
=== 1950s to 1969 ===
==== France and Germany ====
"[O]n 17 February 1952 ... an abridged version of the play was performed in the studio of the Club d'Essai de la Radio and was broadcast on [French] radio ... [A]lthough he sent a polite note that Roger Blin read out, Beckett himself did not turn up." Part of his introduction reads:

I don't know who Godot is. I don't even know (above all don't know) if he exists. And I don't know if they believe in him or not – those two who are waiting for him. The other two who pass by towards the end of each of the two acts, that must be to break up the monotony. All I knew I showed. It's not much, but it's enough for me, by a wide margin. I'll even say that I would have been satisfied with less. As for wanting to find in all that a broader, loftier meaning to carry away from the performance, along with the program and the Eskimo pie, I cannot see the point of it. But it must be possible ... Estragon, Vladimir, Pozzo, Lucky, their time and their space, I was able to know them a little, but far from the need to understand. Maybe they owe you explanations. Let them supply it. Without me. They and I are through with each other.

The play was first published in September 1952 by Les Éditions de Minuit and released on 17 October 1952 in advance of the first full theatrical performance; only 2500 copies were printed of this first edition. On 4 January 1953, "[t]hirty reviewers came to the générale of En attendant Godot before the public opening ... Contrary to later legend, the reviewers were kind ... Some dozen reviews in daily newspapers range[d] from tolerant to enthusiastic ... Reviews in the weeklies [were] longer and more fervent; moreover, they appeared in time to lure spectators to that first thirty-day run" which began on 5 January 1953 at the Théâtre de Babylone, Paris. Early public performances were not, however, without incident: during one performance "the curtain had to be brought down after Lucky's monologue as twenty, well-dressed, but disgruntled spectators whistled and hooted derisively ... One of the protesters [even] wrote a vituperative letter dated 2 February 1953 to Le Monde."

The cast comprised Pierre Latour (Estragon), Lucien Raimbourg (Vladimir), Jean Martin (Lucky) and Roger Blin (Pozzo). The actor due to play Pozzo found a more remunerative role and so the director – a shy, lean man in real life – had to step in and play the stout bombaster himself with a pillow amplifying his stomach. Both boys were played by Serge Lecointe. The entire production was done on the thinnest of shoestring budgets; the large battered valise that Martin carried "was found among the city's refuse by the husband of the theatre dresser on his rounds as he worked clearing the dustbins", for example. Blin helped the actors embody their characters by asking them to determine a physical malady that would contribute to the nature of their character. Latour emphasized Estragon's bad feet and Raimbourg Vladimir's prostate problems, while Blin played Pozzo as a man with heart difficulties. Martin played Lucky with the symptoms of Parkinson's disease.

A particularly significant production – from Beckett's perspective – took place in Lüttringhausen Prison near Remscheid in Germany. An inmate obtained a copy of the French first edition, translated it himself into German and obtained permission to stage the play. The first night had been on 29 November 1953. He wrote to Beckett in October 1954: "You will be surprised to be receiving a letter about your play Waiting for Godot, from a prison where so many thieves, forgers, toughs, homos, crazy men and killers spend this bitch of a life waiting ... and waiting ... and waiting. Waiting for what? Godot? Perhaps." Beckett was intensely moved and intended to visit the prison to see a last performance of the play but it never happened. This marked "the beginning of Beckett's enduring links with prisons and prisoners ... He took a tremendous interest in productions of his plays performed in prisons."

==== UK ====
Like all of Beckett's translations, the English translation of Waiting for Godot is not simply a literal translation of En attendant Godot. "Small but significant differences separate the French and English text. Some, like Vladimir's inability to remember the farmer's name (Bonnelly), show how the translation became more indefinite, attrition and loss of memory more pronounced." A number of biographical details were removed, all adding to a general "vaguening" of the text which he continued to trim for the rest of his life.

The English-language version saw its first UK production on 3 August 1955 at the Arts Theatre in London, directed by Peter Hall, with Paul Daneman as Vladimir, Peter Woodthorpe as Estragon, Peter Bull as Pozzo, Timothy Bateson as Lucky, and Michael Walker as The Boy; when the play transferred to the Criterion Theatre on 12 September, Hugh Burden took over the role of Vladimir. During an early rehearsal Hall told the cast "I haven't really the foggiest idea what some of it means ... But if we stop and discuss every line we'll never open."

Again, the printed version preceded it (New York: Grove Press, 1954) but Faber's "mutilated" edition did not materialise until 1956. A "corrected" edition was subsequently produced in 1965. "The most accurate text is in Theatrical Notebooks I, (Ed.) Dougald McMillan and James Knowlson (Faber and Grove, 1993). It is based on Beckett's revisions for his Schiller-Theater production (1975) and the London San Quentin Drama Workshop, based on the Schiller production but revised further at the Riverside Studios (March 1984)."

In the 1950s, theatre was strictly censored in the UK, to Beckett's amazement since he thought it a bastion of free speech. The Lord Chamberlain insisted that the word "erection" be removed, "'Fartov' became 'Popov' and Mrs Gozzo had 'warts' instead of 'clap'". Indeed, there were attempts to ban the play completely. Lady Dorothy Howitt wrote to the Lord Chamberlain, saying: "One of the many themes running through the play is the desire of two old tramps continually to relieve themselves. Such a dramatisation of lavatory necessities is offensive and against all sense of British decency." "The first unexpurgated version of Godot in England ... opened at the Royal Court on 30 December 1964."

The London run was not without incident. In 1959, Peter Bull recalled the reaction of the first-night audience:

Waves of hostility came whirling over the footlights, and the mass exodus, which was to form such a feature of the run of the piece, started quite soon after the curtain had risen. The audible groans were also fairly disconcerting ... The curtain fell to mild applause, we took a scant three calls [Peter Woodthorpe reported only one curtain call] and a depression and a sense of anti-climax descended on us all.

The critics were less than kind but "[e]verything changed on Sunday 7 August 1955 with Kenneth Tynan's and Harold Hobson's reviews in The Observer and The Sunday Times. Beckett was always grateful to the two reviewers for their support ... which more or less transformed the play overnight into the rage of London." "At the end of the year, the Evening Standard Drama Awards were held for the first time ... Feelings ran high and the opposition, led by Sir Malcolm Sargent, threatened to resign if Godot won [The Best New Play category]. An English compromise was worked out by changing the title of the award. Godot became The Most Controversial Play of the Year. It is a prize that has never been given since."

On 27 April 1960, the BBC Third Programme broadcast the very first radio adaptation, directed by Donald McWhinnie, with Patrick Magee as Vladimir, Wilfrid Brambell as Estragon, Felix Felton as Pozzo, Donal Donnelly as Lucky and Jeremy Ward as The Boy.

On 26 June 1961, Donald McWhinnie directed a production broadcast on BBC Television, with Jack MacGowran as Vladimir, Peter Woodthorpe as Estragon, Felix Felton as Pozzo, Timothy Bateson as Lucky and Mark Mileham as The Boy.

On 5 February 1962, the BBC Home Service broadcast a radio production as part of the From the Fifties series, directed by Robin Midgley with Nigel Stock as Vladimir, Kenneth Griffith as Estragon, Philip Leaver as Pozzo, Andrew Sachs as Lucky and Terry Raven as The Boy.

In December 1964, Nicol Williamson played Vladimir, Alfred Lynch played Estragon and Jack MacGowran played Lucky in a production at London's Royal Court Theatre directed by Anthony Page. This was the first West End revival since the play's British première.

==== US ====
Planning for an American tour for Waiting for Godot started in 1955. The first American tour was directed by Alan Schneider and produced by Michael Myerberg. Bert Lahr and Tom Ewell acted in the initial production.

The first part of the tour was a disaster. The play was originally set to be shown in Washington and Philadelphia. However, low advance sales forced the play to be performed in Miami for two weeks in early January 1956 at the newly opened Coconut Grove Playhouse, where the audience was made up of vacationers. It had been promoted as "the laugh sensation of two continents" in the notices run by Myerberg in the local newspapers.

Most audience members were baffled by the play. Theatregoers would leave after the first act, describing it as a play where "nothing happens", and taxi drivers would wait in front of the theatre to take them home. The Miami showing caused the cancellation of the showings in New York.

By April 1956, new showings were planned. That month, Schneider and most of the cast were replaced. Herbert Berghof took over as director and E. G. Marshall replaced Tom Ewell as Vladimir. The play had its Broadway premiere at the John Golden Theatre on 19 April 1956, with Bert Lahr as Estragon, E. G. Marshall as Vladimir, Alvin Epstein as Lucky, and Kurt Kasznar as Pozzo. The New York showing of the play prompted discussions of the play being an allegory. One reviewer, Henry Hewes of the Saturday Review, identified Godot as God, Pozzo as a capitalist-aristocrat, and Lucky as labour-proletarian. This prompted Beckett to issue a rare statement, stating that the reaction was based on a misconception of the play. To Beckett, the play tries not to be able to be defined. The New York showing of the play was well-received with critics. Brooks Atkinson of The New York Times praised Lahr for his performance as Estragon. The production was recorded as a two-record album by Columbia Masterworks Records.

In 1957, four years after its world premiere, Waiting for Godot was staged for one night only at the San Quentin State Prison in California. Herbert Blau with the San Francisco Actor's Workshop directed the production. Some 1,400 inmates encountered the performance. Beckett later gave Rick Cluchey, a former prisoner from San Quentin, financial and moral support over a period of many years. Cluchey played Vladimir in two productions in the former Gallows room of the San Quentin California State Prison, which had been converted into a 65-seat theatre and, like the German prisoner before him, went on to work on a variety of Beckett's plays after his release. Cluchey said, "The thing that everyone in San Quentin understood about Beckett, while the rest of the world had trouble catching up, was what it meant to be in the face of it." The attitude of this troupe was to move it away from a commercial attitude to an avant garde attitude. As well, the play did not have competition between the actors playing Vladimir and Estragon for being the star of the show. The most successful showing was in November 1957 at the San Quentin prison, where the play had a profound impact on the inmates and spurred them to start a drama group in the prison. They would go on to produce seven of Beckett's works. In 1958, the play, produced by the San Francisco Actor's Workshop, would be chosen to go to Brussels for the 1958 World's Fair.

The first Broadway revival was produced in 1957 at the Ethel Barrymore Theatre directed by Herbert Berghof, but only ran for six performances (21–26 January). It had an all-Black cast, including Earle Hyman as Vladimir, Mantan Moreland as Estragon, Rex Ingram as Pozzo and Geoffrey Holder as Lucky. This rendition of Waiting for Godot played on themes of the Africana absurd as opposed to the European absurd. For example, Hyman's career as a classical actor and Moreland's as a vaudeville actor were used to juxtapose the different facets of African American theatre in the mind of the audience.

Also in May 1957, a production directed by Walter Biakel was staged at the Studebaker Theatre in Chicago with Harvey Korman as Vladimir, Louis Zorich as Estragon, Moultrie Patten as Pozzo and Mike Nichols as Lucky.

In 1965, a production at the Olney Theatre in Olney, Maryland, starred Dana Elcar as "Vladimir" and Stefan Gierasch as "Estragon" as part of A Festival of the Absurd.

==== Australia ====
In the Australian premiere at the Arrow Theatre in Melbourne in 1957, Barry Humphries played Estragon opposite Peter O'Shaughnessy's Vladimir.

==== Canada ====
Waiting for Godot was first performed at the Stratford Festival in 1968 at the Avon Theatre in a production directed by William Hutt, with Powys Thomas as Vladimir, Eric Donkin as Estragon, James Blendick as Pozzo, Adrian Pecknold as Lucky and Douglas Birkenshaw as The Boy.

==== South Africa ====
The very first South African production was performed in 1955 at the Little Theatre in Cape Town, produced by Leonard Schach, with Gavin Haughton as Vladimir, Alec Bell as Estragon, Donald Inskip as Lucky, Gordon Roberts as Pozzo and Frank Rothgiesser as The Boy. The play was also presented at the Hofmeyr Theatre and then taken on a tour of several country towns in South Africa.

==== Brazil ====
After a few amateur productions in the 1950s, the first professional staging of the play in Brazil happened in 1969, directed by Flávio Rangel and staged by actress Cacilda Becker as Estragon and her real-life husband, actor Walmor Chagas as Vladimir. After few performances, on 6 May 1969, Becker had a stroke and collapsed during the intermission. She was immediately taken to a hospital, still wearing the play's costume, and remained in a coma for 38 days until her death on 14 June.

==== Poland ====
The Polish premiere took place on 25 January 1957, at Teatr Współczesny in Warsaw. directed by Jerzy Kreczmar and featuring Tadeusz Fijewski as Vladimir and Józef Kondrat as Estragon. The Polish premiere was the fifth in the world and the first in the Communist Bloc.

=== 1970s to 2000 ===
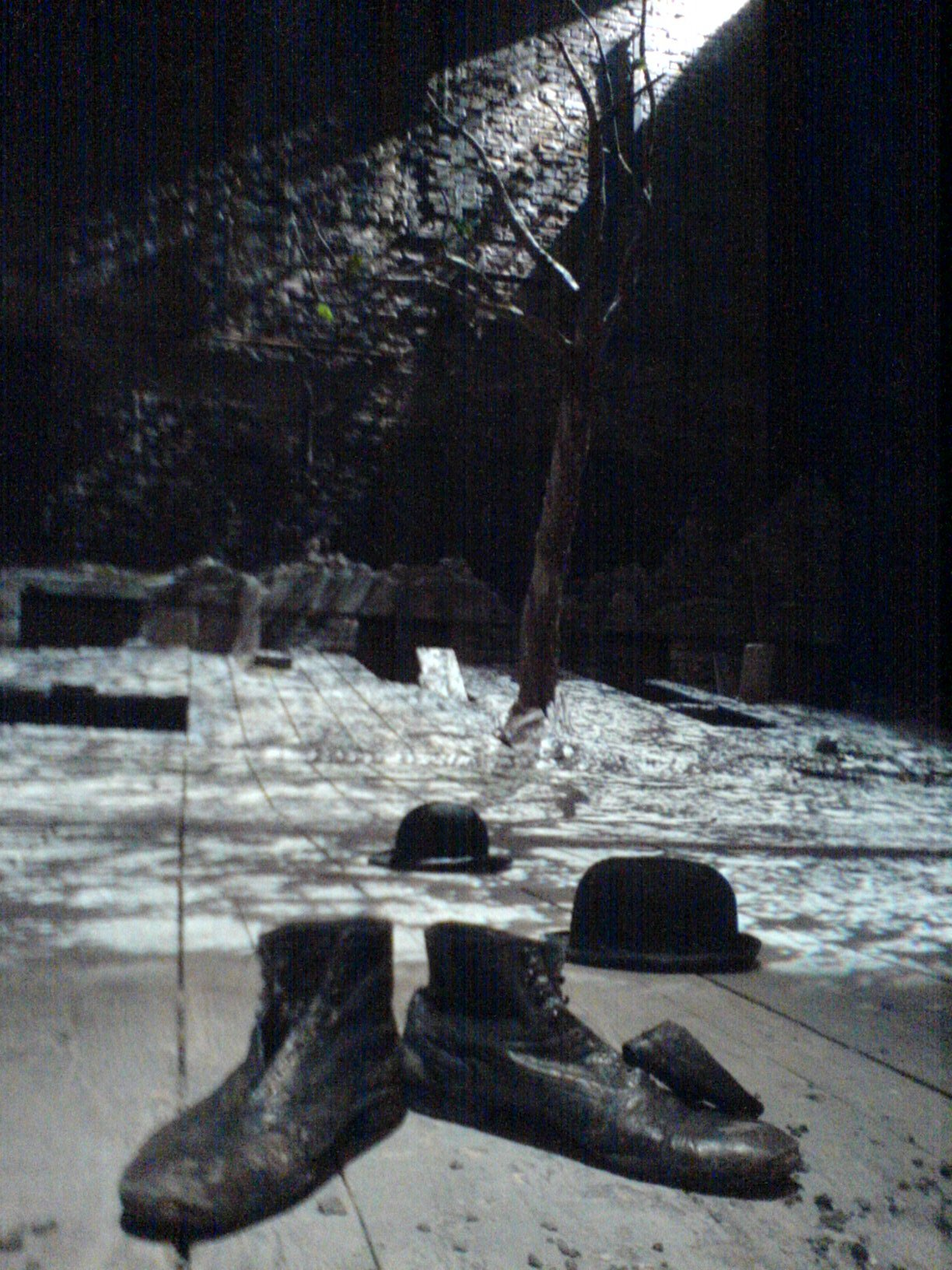
Set of Theatre Royal Haymarket 2009 production

In 1977, PBS broadcast an adaptation for television directed by Charles S. Dubin and performed by the Los Angeles Actors' Theatre, with Dana Elcar as Vladimir, Donald Moffat as Estragon, Ralph Waite as Pozzo and Bruce French as Lucky.

On 4 September 1977, as part of the British television series Drama, the Open University filmed a production of Godot directed by Richard Callanan with Leo McKern as Estragon, Max Wall as Vladimir, Graham Crowden as Pozzo, Basil Clarke as Lucky and Toby Page as The Boy.

In 1978, a production was staged by Walter Asmus at the Brooklyn Academy of Music in New York City with Sam Waterston as Vladimir, Austin Pendleton as Estragon, Milo O'Shea as Lucky and Michael Egan as Pozzo.

A young Geoffrey Rush played Vladimir opposite his then flatmate Mel Gibson as Estragon in 1979 at the Jane Street Theatre in Sydney.

In 1980, Braham Murray directed a production at the Royal Exchange Theatre in Manchester with Max Wall as Vladimir, Trevor Peacock as Estragon and Wolfe Morris as Pozzo.

Also in 1980, a production was performed at the Baxter Theatre in Cape Town, directed by Donald Howarth, with John Kani ("Vladimir"), Winston Ntshona ("Estragon"), Pieter-Dirk Uys ("Pozzo"), Peter Piccolo ("Lucky") and Silamour Philander ("The Boy"). The multiracial cast, approved by Beckett himself, caused quite a stir, but the play received good reviews. After the Cape Town run, the play was also performed at the Grahamstown National Arts Festival, the Port Elizabeth Opera House, and the Market Theatre, Johannesburg (where it ran for three weeks). In 1981, the production went on an international tour to the US and Britain, with Bill Flynn replacing Uys as "Pozzo". The tour included New Haven, Connecticut, The Old Vic Theatre in London and the Oxford Playhouse in Oxford. It was also invited to participate in the First International Baltimore Theatre Festival but on arrival the play was picketed by anti-Apartheid demonstrators who claimed that it and the Baxter Theatre were "part and parcel of the South African propaganda machine to misrepresent what was taking place in the country", so the performances were canceled.

The 1984 Stratford Festival production of Waiting for Godot, directed by Leon Rubin, was performed at the Tom Patterson Theatre, with Brian Bedford as Vladimir, Edward Abenza as Estragon, Andreas Katsulas as Pozzo, Paul Zimet as Lucky and Adam Poynter as The Boy.

The Mitzi E. Newhouse Theater at Lincoln Center was the site of a 1988 revival directed by Mike Nichols, featuring Robin Williams (Estragon), Steve Martin (Vladimir), Bill Irwin (Lucky), F. Murray Abraham (Pozzo), and Lukas Haas (boy). With a limited run of seven weeks and an all-star cast, it was financially successful, but the critical reception was not particularly favourable, with Frank Rich of The New York Times writing, "Audiences will still be waiting for a transcendent Godot long after the clowns at Lincoln Center, like so many others passing through Beckett's eternal universe before them, have come and gone."

The play was revived in London's West End at the Queen's Theatre in a production directed by Les Blair, which opened on 30 September 1991. Rik Mayall played Vladimir and Adrian Edmondson played Estragon, with Philip Jackson as Pozzo and Christopher Ryan as Lucky; the boy was played by Dean Gaffney and Duncan Thornley. Derek Jarman provided the scenic design, in collaboration with Madeleine Morris.

In 1992, in what would be his last stage appearance, Dana Elcar reprised his 1965 stage role and 1977 TV movie role of Vladimir in a 1992 Los Angeles production at the Santa Paula Theatre Center directed by Deborah LaVine.

On 3 September 1994, a rare French-language recording of the play, recorded at the Theatre de Babylone shortly after the 1953 Paris premiere with the original cast and director (see above) was broadcast on BBC Radio 3. The following day, 4 September 1994, BBC Radio 3 broadcast a production in English with Alan Howard as Vladimir, Michael Maloney as Estragon, Stratford Jones as Pozzo, Simon Russell Beale as Lucky, Tristan Moriarty as The Boy and Geraldine McEwan as The Narrator; this production was rebroadcast on BBC Radio 3 30 June 1995 and 5 September 1999.

In 1996, the Stratford Festival staged a production directed by Brian Bedford, with Stephen Ouimette as Estragon, Tom McCamus as Vladimir, James Blendick as Pozzo, Tim MacDonald as Lucky and Joe Dinicol as The Boy. The cast reunited in March 1997 to perform the play on CBC Radio's "Bank of Montreal Stratford Festival Series" and again at the Stratford Festival for the 1998 season at the Tom Patterson Theatre (with Philip Psutka replacing Dinicol as The Boy), again directed by Bedford.

In June 1999, the Royal Exchange, Manchester staged a production directed by Matthew Lloyd with Richard Wilson as Vladimir, Brian Pettifer as Estragon and Nicky Henson as Pozzo.

=== 2000 to present ===
Neil Armfield directed a controversial production in January 2003 with Max Cullen as Estragon, John Gaden as Vladimir, Boddan Koca as Pozzo and Steve Le Marquand as Lucky at Sydney's Belvoir St Theatre. A representative of Beckett's estate was present at opening night and had believed a contract for the play had stated that no music was to be used in the production.

On 16 April 2006, BBC Radio 3 broadcast a production directed by John Tydeman, with Sean Barrett as Vladimir, David Burke as Estragon, Nigel Anthony as Lucky and The Narrator, Terence Rigby as Pozzo and Zachary Fox as The Boy.

On 2 and 3 November 2007, two performances were staged in the Lower Ninth Ward of New Orleans, two years after the neighborhood had been devastated by the failure of the federal levee system caused by Hurricane Katrina. This was followed by two performances in the similarly damaged neighborhood Gentilly on 9 and 10 November. The production was staged by American artist Paul Chan, the NYC-based arts organization Creative Time, and the Classical Theatre of Harlem. It featured New Orleans native Wendell Pierce as Vladimir, J. Kyle Manzay as Estragon, Tony Felix and Michael Pepp as Boy. Waiting for Godot in New Orleans

On 30 April 2009, a production directed by Sean Mathias, with Sir Ian McKellen as Estragon and Sir Patrick Stewart as Vladimir, opened at the Haymarket Theatre in London's West End. Their performances received critical acclaim, and were the subject of an eight-part documentary series called Theatreland, which was produced by Sky Arts. The production was revived at the same theatre in January 2010 for 11 weeks and in 2010 toured internationally with Roger Rees replacing Stewart as Vladimir. This production toured to Adelaide, South Australia, in June 2010, playing at Her Majesty's.

A 2009 Broadway revival of the play starring Nathan Lane as Estragon, John Goodman as Pozzo, John Glover as Lucky and Bill Irwin as Vladimir was nominated for three Tony Awards: Best Revival of a Play, Best Performance by a Featured Actor in a Play (John Glover), and Best Costume Design of a Play (Jane Greenwood).

In 2012, a critically acclaimed production starred Alan Mandell, Barry McGovern, James Cromwell, and Hugo Armstrong at the Mark Taper Forum in Los Angeles, receiving five Ovation Awards, including best production of a play by a large theater and for actors Alan Mandell and Hugo Armstrong.

For the Stratford Festival's 61st season in 2013, Jennifer Tarver directed a new production at the Tom Patterson Theatre starring Brian Dennehy as Pozzo, Stephen Ouimette as Estragon, Tom Rooney as Vladimir and Randy Hughson as Lucky.

A new production directed by Sean Mathias with Ian McKellen as Estragon, Patrick Stewart as Vladimir, Billy Crudup as Lucky and Shuler Hensley as Pozzo began previews at the Cort Theatre on Broadway on 26 October 2013, and ran from 24 November 2013, to 30 March 2014.

The Sydney Theatre Company staged Godot in November 2013 with Richard Roxburgh as Estragon, Hugo Weaving as Vladimir, and Philip Quast as Pozzo, directed by Andrew Upton.

In November 2018, the Druid Theater Company staged Godot at the Gerald W. Lynch Theater at John Jay College in Manhattan starring Garrett Lombard, Aaron Monaghan, Marty Rea and Rory Nolan and directed by Garry Hynes.

In October 2020, a production of Godot was performed at the Centre for the Less Good Idea in Johannesburg, South Africa, "the first physical event [before a live audience] since the start of South Africa's nationwide [COVID-19] lockdown earlier [that] year." Directed by Phala Ookeditse Phala, the cast included Tony Bonani Miyambo as Estragon, Billy Langa as Vladimir, Jemma Kahn as Lucky and The Boy and Stefania Du Toit as Pozzo.

In May 2021 during the COVID-19 pandemic, a production, directed by Scott Elliot with Ethan Hawke as Vladimir, John Leguizamo as Estragon, Wallace Shawn as Lucky and Tariq Trotter as Pozzo, was performed online in the style of a Zoom teleconference call with each actor performing on camera from their respective locations. The production was presented by The New Group and broadcast by the Off Stage Broadway production company for rental or full-access pass.

In New York City, the Theatre for a New Audience staged a production from 4 November 2023, to 3 December 2023 (extended to 23 December 2023) with Paul Sparks as Estragon, Michael Shannon as Vladimir, Ajay Naidu as Pozzo, and Jeff Biehl as Lucky. It was directed by Arin Arbus.

A production directed by James Macdonald ran at the Theatre Royal, Haymarket, in London's West End from September to December 2024, with Ben Whishaw as Vladimir, Lucian Msamati as Estragon, Tom Edden as Lucky and Jonathan Slinger as Pozzo.

A new Broadway production launched in 2025, directed by Jamie Lloyd and starring longtime friends and collaborators Keanu Reeves and Alex Winter as Estragon and Vladimir, respectively, Brandon J. Dirden as Pozzo, and Michael Patrick Thornton as Lucky. Previews began on 13 September. The show opened on 28 September to mixed reviews, and had a limited run, closing on 4 January 2026.

The 2026 season of the Stratford Festival included a production at the Festival Theatre with Estragon played by Tom McCamus, Vladimir played by Paul Gross, Pozzo played by Jonathan Gold, Lucky played by David W. Keeley, and The Boy alternating between child actors Gordon Paul Miller and Asher Albert Waxman.

== Adaptations ==
Beckett received numerous requests to adapt Waiting for Godot for film and television. The author, however, resisted these offers, except for occasional approval out of friendship or sympathy for the person making the request. This was the case when he agreed to some televised productions in his lifetime (including a 1961 American telecast with Zero Mostel as Estragon and Burgess Meredith as Vladimir that New York Times theatre critic Alvin Klein describes as having "left critics bewildered and is now a classic"). When Keep Films made Beckett an offer to film an adaptation in which Peter O'Toole would feature, Beckett tersely told his French publisher to advise them: "I do not want a film of Godot." The BBC broadcast a television production of Waiting for Godot on 26 June 1961 (see above), a version for radio having already been transmitted on 25 April 1960. Beckett watched the programme with a few close friends in Peter Woodthorpe's Chelsea flat. He was unhappy with what he saw. "My play", he said, "wasn't written for this box. My play was written for small men locked in a big space. Here you're all too big for the place." One analysis argued that Beckett's opposition to alterations and creative adaptations stem from his abiding concern with audience reaction rather than proprietary rights over a text being performed.

On the other hand, theatrical adaptations have had more success. For instance, Andre Engel adapted the play in 1979 and was produced in Strasbourg. In this performance, the two main characters were fragmented into 10 characters. The first four involved Gogo, Didi, Lucky, and Pozzo while the rest were divided into three pairs: two tramps, a pair of grim heterosexuals, and a bride raped by her groom. Each of these embodied some characteristics of Estragon and Vladimir. A similar approach was employed by Tamiya Kuriyama who directed his own adaptation of the play in Tokyo. These interpretations, which only used extracts from the dialogues of the original, focused on the minds of the urban-dwellers today, who are considered to be no longer individuals but one of the many or of the whole, which turned such individuals into machines.

In 1991, Chinese avant-garde theatre director Meng Jinghui (b. 1964) adapted the play (Dengdai Geduo in Chinese) for his master's graduation performance at Central Academy of Drama, with unmistakable allusions to the Tiananmen Square protests in 1989. By using metatheatrical tropes, Meng's adaptation not only condemned both the government and the protesters but expressed strong senses of disillusion and cynicism. Additionally, by dramatically changing the main characters and the ending—transforming the philosophical and sceptic Vladimir in the original script into a vengeful idealist-turned-cynic who strangled Godot to death, Meng captures the conflicted feelings of the Chinese generation born in the 1960s towards China's socialist past.

Arshad Mushtaq directed a 2004 Kashmiri adaptation of the play titled Su Yee (transl. He will come) staged at Tagore Hall, Srinagar. The play won best direction and production by the Jammu and Kashmir government's Academy of Art, Culture and Languages in 2004. In 2005, Mushtaq won the best director award at Doordarshan's theatre festival.

A web series adaptation titled While Waiting for Godot was also produced at New York University in 2013, setting the story among the modern-day New York homeless. Directed by Rudi Azank, the English script was based on Beckett's original French manuscript of En attendant Godot (the new title being an alternate translation of the French) prior to censorship from British publishing houses in the 1950s, as well as adaptation to the stage. Season 1 of the web series won Best Cinematography at the 2014 Rome Web Awards. Season 2 was released in Spring 2014 on the show's official website whilewaitingforgodot.com.

== Place in Beckett's work ==
Although not his favourite among his plays, Waiting for Godot was the work which brought Beckett fame and financial stability and as such it always held a special place in his affections. "When the manuscript and rare books dealer, Henry Wenning, asked him if he could sell the original French manuscript for him, Beckett replied: 'Rightly or wrongly have decided not to let Godot go yet. Neither sentimental nor financial, probably peak of market now and never such an offer. Can't explain.'"

== Related works ==
- Racine's Bérénice is a play "in which nothing happens for five acts". In the preface to this play Racine writes: "All creativity consists in making something out of nothing." Beckett was an avid scholar of the 17th-century playwright and lectured on him during his time at Trinity. "Essential to the static quality of a Racine play is the pairing of characters to talk at length to each other."
- The title character of Balzac's 1851 play Mercadet is waiting for financial salvation from his never-seen business partner, Godeau. Although Beckett was familiar with Balzac's prose, he insisted that he learned of the play after finishing Waiting for Godot.
- Many critics, including Al Alvarez and Christopher Ricks, regard the protagonists in Beckett's novel Mercier and Camier as prototypes of Vladimir and Estragon. "If you want to find the origins of Godot", Beckett told Colin Duckworth once, "look at Murphy." Here we see the agonised protagonist yearning for self-knowledge, or at least complete freedom of thought at any cost, and the dichotomy and interaction of mind and body. Mercier and Camier wander aimlessly about a boggy, rain-soaked island that, although not explicitly named, is Beckett's native Ireland. They speak convoluted dialogues similar to Vladimir and Estragon's, joke about the weather and chat in pubs, while the purpose of their odyssey is never made clear. The waiting in Godot is the wandering of the novel. "There are large chunks of dialogue which he later transferred directly into Godot."
- Waiting for Godot has been compared with Tom Stoppard's 1966 play, Rosencrantz and Guildenstern Are Dead. Parallels include two central characters who appear to be aspects of a single character and whose lives are dependent on outside forces over which they have little control. There are also plot parallels, the act of waiting as a significant element of the play, during the waiting, the characters pass time by playing Questions, impersonating other characters, at times repeatedly interrupting each other while at other times remaining silent for long periods.
- The 1991 West End production (see above), inspired Rik Mayall and Adrian Edmondson to develop Bottom, which Mayall described as a "cruder cousin" to Godot.

== Works inspired by Godot ==
- An unauthorised sequel was written by Miodrag Bulatović in 1966: Godo je došao (Godot Arrived). It was translated from Serbian into German (Godot ist gekommen) and French. The playwright presents Godot as a baker who ends up being condemned to death by the four main characters. Since it turns out he is indestructible, Lucky declares him non-existent. Although Beckett was noted for disallowing productions that took even slight liberties with his plays, he let this pass without incident but not without comment. Ruby Cohn writes: "On the flyleaf of my edition of the Bulatović play, Beckett is quoted: 'I think that all that has nothing to do with me.'"
- Alan Titley's Irish-language sequel Tagann Godot (Godot Arrives) was written for Oireachtas na Gaeilge in 1987 and produced as a radio play by RTÉ and on stage in 1990 at the Peacock Theatre, Dublin directed by Tómas Mac Anna.
- In the late 1990s an unauthorised sequel was written by Daniel Curzon entitled Godot Arrives. Máirtín Coilféir finds similarities to Titley's work, of which Curzon was unaware.
- A radical transformation was written by Bernard Pautrat, performed at Théâtre National de Strasbourg in 1979–1980: Ils allaient obscurs sous la nuit solitaire (d'après 'En attendant Godot' de Samuel Beckett) (They Went Dark Under the Lonely Night (based on 'Waiting for Godot' by Samuel Beckett)). It features not four actors and the brief appearance of a fifth one (as in Beckett's play), but ten actors. Four of them bore the names of Gogo, Didi, Lucky and Pozzo. The dialogue, consisting of extensive quotations from the original, was distributed in segments among the ten actors, not necessarily following the order of the original."
- Gujarati playwright Labhshankar Thakar, along with Subhash Shah, wrote a play Ek Undar ane Jadunath (A Rat and Jadunath) based on Godot in 1966.
- In 2006, John Griffin wrote and produced a play titled Godot Has Left the Building, which serves as a modern-day homage to Beckett's Waiting for Godot. Set in a post-apocalyptic landscape filled with the remnants of modern technology, the play follows two men, Sebastian and Joe, as they struggle to find meaning in their desolate world. The play retains the absurdist themes of its predecessor, focusing on existential despair and the search for purpose in a seemingly indifferent universe. Unlike Waiting for Godot, which leaves many questions unanswered, Godot Has Left the Building is noted for its more direct confrontation with the futility of waiting and the inevitability of meaninglessness. The play received mixed reviews, with some critics praising its atmosphere and performances, while others criticized it for not offering the same depth as Beckett's original work.
- Antoinette Nwandu's play Pass Over takes inspiration from Waiting for Godot; it is set instead on a street corner in Chicago with two young black men, with appearances from a white man and an officer. It was made into a film of the same name directed by Spike Lee in 2018.
- In 2019, Mister & Mischief created Escape from Godot, where an audience of eight participants must work together to explore the space, solve puzzles, call cues, and watch the performance in order to escape before "lawyers arrive to sue everyone in the theater for the entirely unauthorized and disrespectful production".

== In popular culture and media ==
- In November/December 1987, Garry Trudeau ran a week-long spoof in his syndicated comic strip Doonesbury called "Waiting for Mario" in which two characters discussed – and dismissed – each other's hopes that Mario Cuomo would declare as a candidate in the 1988 Democratic Party presidential primaries.
- In 1992 Sesame Street had a short video in their segment "Monsterpiece Theater" entitled "Waiting for Elmo". Telly and Grover wait by a bare tree for Elmo to appear. They discuss their situation: if Elmo arrives they would be "happy", if not they would be "angry". Elmo never appears, and the tree declares it does not understand the play before leaving, prompting Telly and Grover to chase after it.
- The 1997 comedy film Waiting for Guffman concerns a small-town community theatre group in Missouri who put on a show hoping to attract the attention of prominent Broadway producer Mort Guffman, who never arrives.
- In 1998 a short comedic sketch in episode 9 season 9 of Mystery Science Theater 3000 featured the two protagonist robots Crow and Tom Servo motionless and expressing they are waiting for "Gorgo" (the titular monster of the movie that was featured). It ends with Mike Nelson disguised as the monster and scaring them off.
- The 2010 documentary film The Impossible Itself is about the 1953 Lüttringhausen and 1957 San Quentin Prison productions of Waiting for Godot.
- A 2001 short film titled Pitch 'n' Putt with Beckett 'n' Joyce, parodies the play, with Beckett and James Joyce awaiting a never-seen W.B. Yeats at a miniature golf course.
- In the 2004 video game, Phoenix Wright: Ace Attorney – Trials and Tribulations, a prosecutor going by the alias, Godot, is portrayed as mysterious after cutting all ties to his life before he went into a coma.
- In the 2008 musical Ride The Cyclone by Brooke Maxwell and Jacob Richmond, the character of Noel Gruber is shown in a flashback to perform an excerpt from Waiting for Godot during his school's nativity play, saying: "There is no room at this Inn, for it is Christmas... Shall we hang ourselves?" Noel's scene partner (portrayed by Jane Doe in the flashback) responds with: "I hear it gives you an erection." "Then we must hang ourselves... immediately" In the scene, the characters don bowler hats and speak in French accents, further cementing the reference.
- The open source game engine Godot is named after the titular character of the play. The two Argentine developers, Juan Linietsky & Ariel Manzur, were repeatedly tasked with updating the engine from a period of time from 2001 to 2014. During this time, they borrowed the name "Godot" to represent the never-ending wish of adding new features to the engine, which would get it closer to an exhaustive product, but never actually complete it. Godot Engine was initially released to the public in 2014.
- A sketch in March 2017 on The Late Show with Stephen Colbert, "Waiting for Godot's Obamacare Replacement", Colbert and Patrick Stewart satirized the Trump administration's failure to implement their announced "repeal and replace" of Obamacare.
- The fourteenth-season finale of It's Always Sunny in Philadelphia (2019), titled "Waiting for Big Mo", is based on the play, substituting Dennis Reynolds and Charlie Kelly for Vladimir and Estragon, Mac McDonald and Sweet Dee Reynolds for Pozzo and Lucky, Frank Reynolds for The Boy, and the titular "Big Mo" for Godot.
- In season 2 episode 6 of Interview With the Vampire, members of the Théâtre des Vampires rehearse a play titled "Waiting for Guido" written by Irish vampire Samuel Barclay. When a performer demands to know at what point in the play Guido will actually arrive, Barclay replies that "He doesn't. He can't. He mustn't. Guido is hope. There can be no hope."

== Awards and nominations ==
=== 2009 West End revival ===
Year	Award	Category	Nominee	Result
2009	Evening Standard Theatre Award	Special Award	Ian McKellen	Nominated

=== 2009 Broadway revival ===
Year	Award	Category	Nominee	Result
2009	Tony Award	Best Revival of a Play		Nominated
2009	Tony Award	Best Featured Actor in a Play	John Glover	Nominated
2009	Tony Award	Best Costume Design of a Play	Jane Greenwood	Nominated
2009	Drama Desk Award	Outstanding Revival of a Play		Nominated
2009	Drama Desk Award	Outstanding Actor in a Play	Bill Irwin	Nominated

=== 2024 West End revival ===
Year	Award	Category	Nominee	Result
2025	Laurence Olivier Award	Best Revival		Nominated
2025	Laurence Olivier Award	Best Actor in a Supporting Role	Tom Edden	Nominated

=== 2025 Broadway revival ===
Year	Award	Category	Nominee	Result
2026	Tony Awards	Best Featured Actor in a Play	Brandon J. Dirden	Nominated
2026	Drama Desk Award	Outstanding Scenic Design of a Play	Soutra Gilmour	Nominated

== See also ==
- Denis Johnston, "Waiting with Beckett", Irish Writing, Spring 1956, pp. 23–28.
- Le Monde's 100 Books of the Century
- Two-hander
- Unseen character
