= Pozzo (Waiting for Godot) =

Character in Waiting for Godot

Pozzo is a character from Samuel Beckett's play Waiting for Godot. His name is Italian for "well" (as in "oil well").

On the surface he is a pompous, sometimes foppish, aristocrat (he claims to live in a manor, own many slaves and a Steinway piano), cruelly using and exploiting those around him (specifically his slave, Lucky and, to a lesser extent, Estragon). He wears similar clothes to Vladimir and Estragon (i.e. a bowler and suit), but they are not in the dire condition theirs are.

== Godot's antagonist ==
While by no means a villain in a conventional sense of the word, Pozzo is sometimes considered (nominally) the "antagonist" of Waiting for Godot. Although he is not technically in opposition to the so-called heroes of the play (Vladimir and Estragon) he does bring chaos into their sheltered world. Upon his first entrance, he immediately goes about attempting to exert authority on the hapless "Didi" and "Gogo" by shouting at them, ordering them about, and generally making a nuisance of himself. Along the way he mercilessly abuses Lucky (physically and mentally) into performing menial and sometimes pointless tasks. However, despite his authoritative presence, he has the tendency of falling to pieces at the (literal) drop of a hat. At certain points in the first act (and for most of the second act; see below) he has minor nervous breakdowns when things don't go his way (e.g. when he misplaces things, when Vladimir and Estragon don't understand him/berate him, etc.). Pozzo should not be seen, however, as merely a mindless, weak oppressor. He has a developed intellectual side: he philosophises intelligently and optimistically.

== On his blindness ==
Pozzo goes through a rather radical transformation between the first and second acts: he goes blind. When he makes his second (final) entrance, he almost immediately falls over and cannot get up. He remains this way for the rest of his scene, helplessly moaning and bemoaning his fate and condition. This change supposedly only occurs in the past day. Some critics interpret this as representing his failure to see the suffering in others, and thus has brought suffering upon himself.

== Pozzo and Estragon ==
Pozzo is often compared to Estragon (just as Lucky is compared to Vladimir) as being the impulsive, right-brained part of his character duo. The idea is that Pozzo and Lucky are simply an extreme form of the relationship between Vladimir and Estragon (the hapless impulsive, and the intellect who protects him), and thus extreme forms of those very characters.

He, like Estragon, has an awful memory, and since he cannot rely on Lucky for memory (as Estragon can on Vladimir), he is even more in the dark (e.g. he cannot even remember one day before). Vladimir claims that he and Estragon know him, but this is naturally not corroborated by Estragon, and the nature of their former relationship remains unknown. He occasionally comes up with poetic metaphors for the current situation, again, just as Estragon does.
