= BAFTA Award for Best Actress in a Supporting Role =

British film industry award

BAFTA Award for Best Supporting Actress
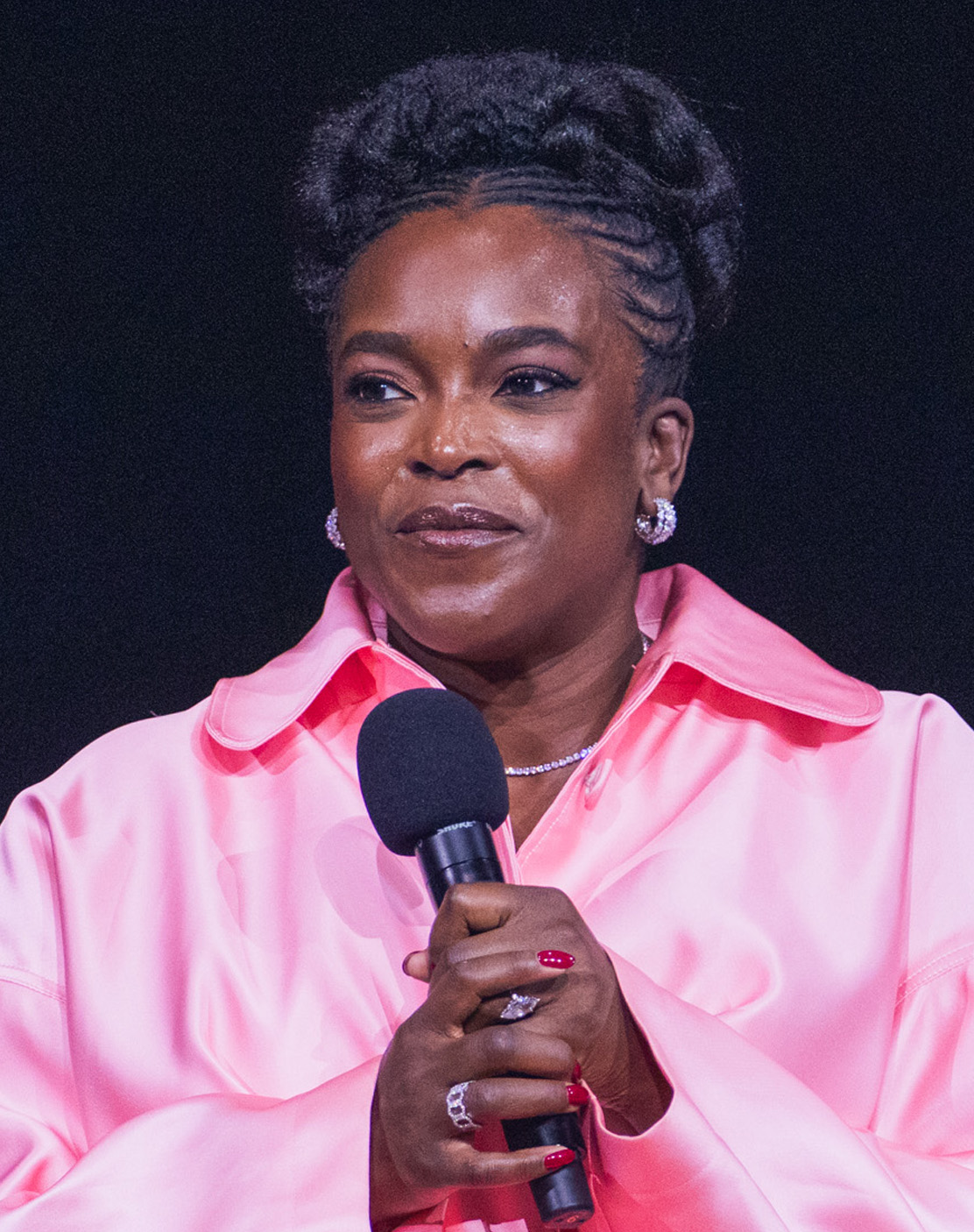
- The 2025 recipient: Wunmi Mosaku
- Awarded for: Best Performance by an Actress in a Supporting Role
- Location: United Kingdom
- Presented by: British Academy of Film and Television Arts
- Currently held by: Wunmi Mosaku for Sinners (2025)
- Website: http://www.bafta.org/

Best Actress in a Supporting Role is a British Academy Film Award presented annually by the British Academy of Film and Television Arts (BAFTA) to recognise an actress who has delivered an outstanding supporting performance in a film.

In the following lists, the titles and names in bold with a gold background are the winners and recipients respectively; those not in bold are the nominees. The years given are those in which the films under consideration were released, not the year of the ceremony, which always takes place the following year.

== History ==
Since 1968, selected actresses have been awarded with the BAFTA Award for Best Actress in a Supporting Role at an annual ceremony. The Best Supporting Actress award has been presented a total of 53 times to 52 different actresses. No award was given out in this category in 1980, when no actors, male or female, were nominated for supporting roles. In addition, the award was replaced with a gender-neutral category for Best Supporting Artist, allotted for the year 1981 only, with all four nominees that year being male. The first winner was Billie Whitelaw for her roles in Charlie Bubbles and Twisted Nerve. The most recent winner is Wunmi Mosaku for her role in Sinners. The record for most wins is three, held by Judi Dench. Kate Winslet has won two times, while each other recipient has only won once in this category. Dench also holds the record for most nominations, with nine. At the 36th BAFTA Film Awards, Rohini Hattangadi and Maureen Stapleton received the same number of votes and thus both shared the award in this category's only tie.

== Winners and nominees ==
indicates the winner

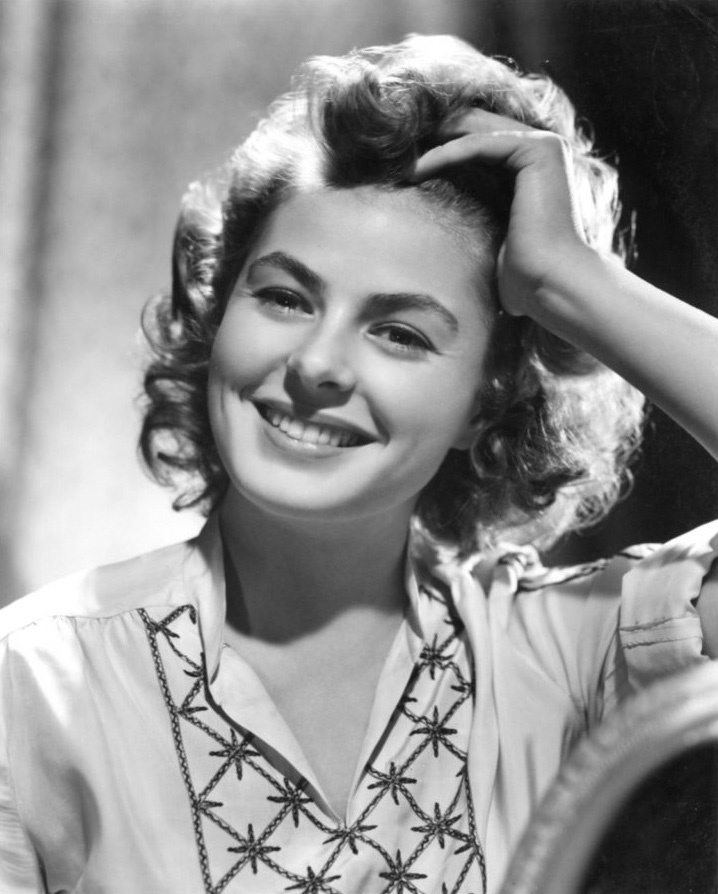
Ingrid Bergman won for Murder on the Orient Express (1974).

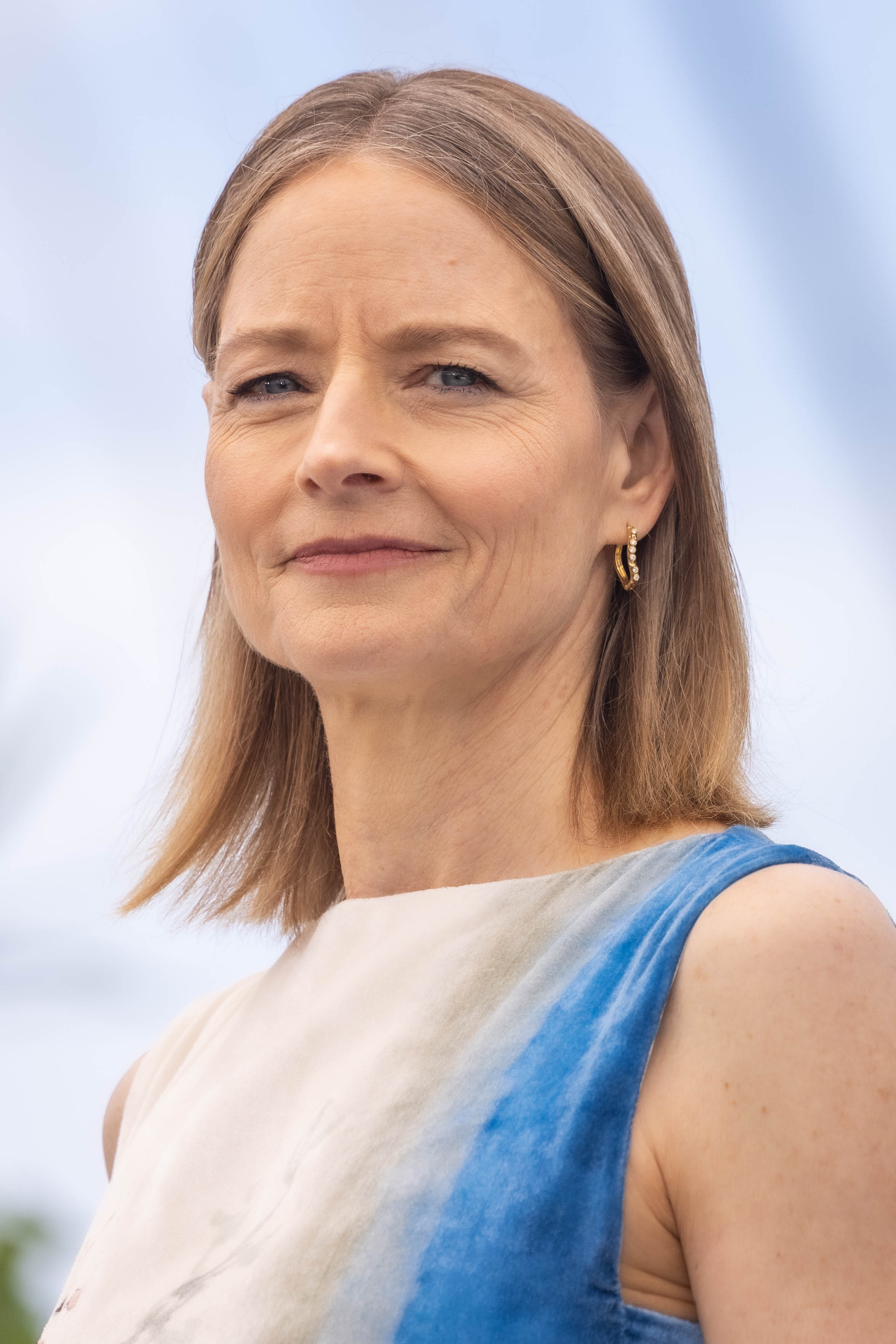
Jodie Foster at age 13, won for Bugsy Malone / Taxi Driver (1976).

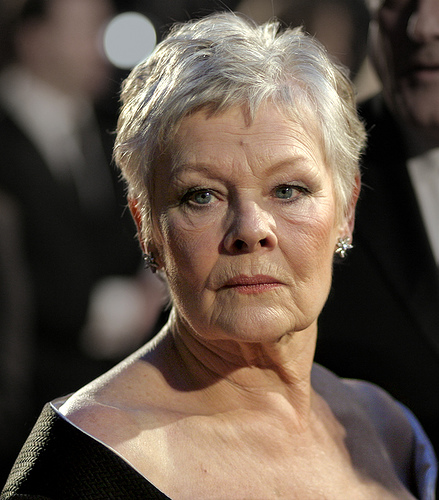
Judi Dench won thrice A Room with a View (1986), A Handful of Dust (1988), and Shakespeare in Love (1998).

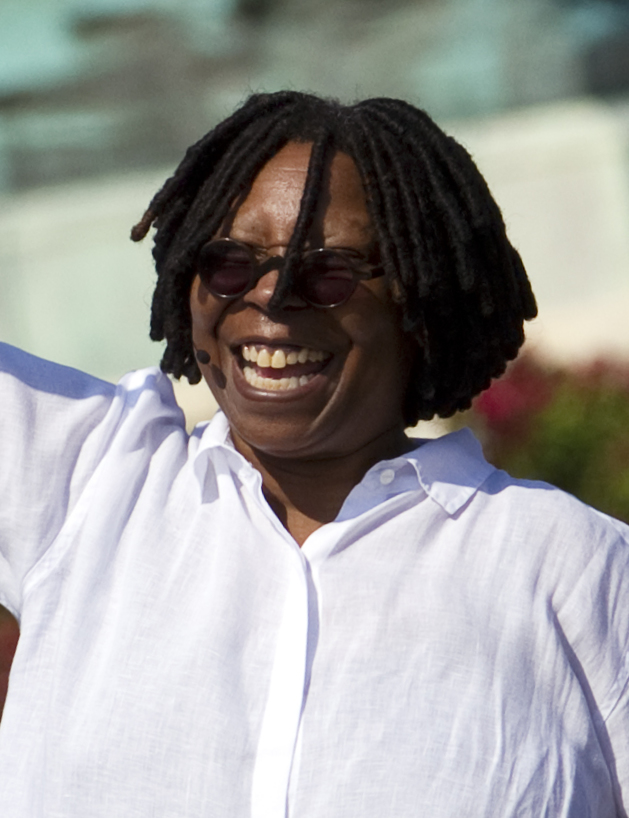
Whoopi Goldberg won for Ghost (1990); first black winner in this category.

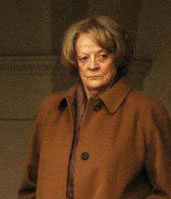
Dame Maggie Smith won for Tea with Mussolini (1999)

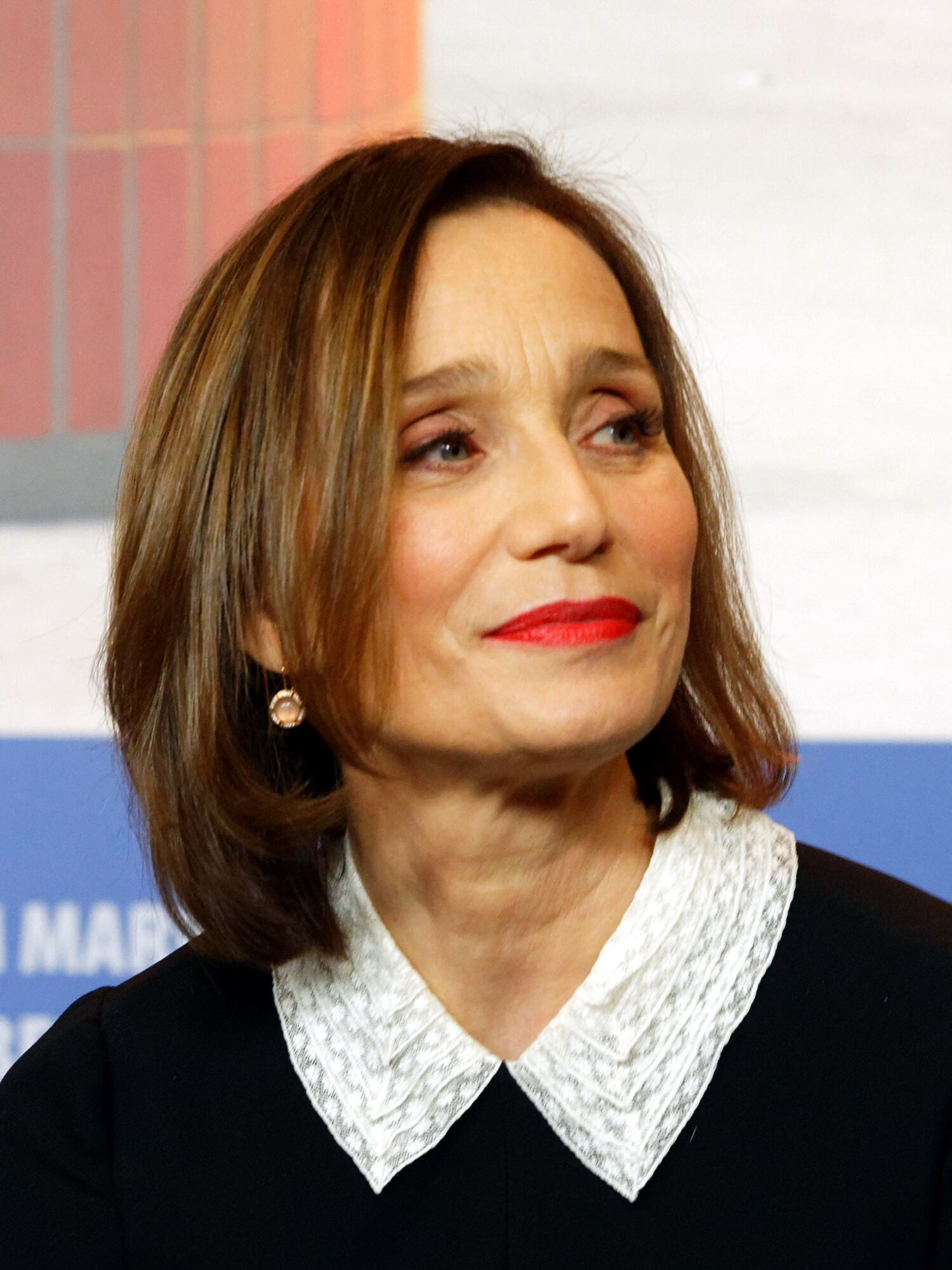
Kristin Scott Thomas won for Four Weddings and a Funeral (1994).

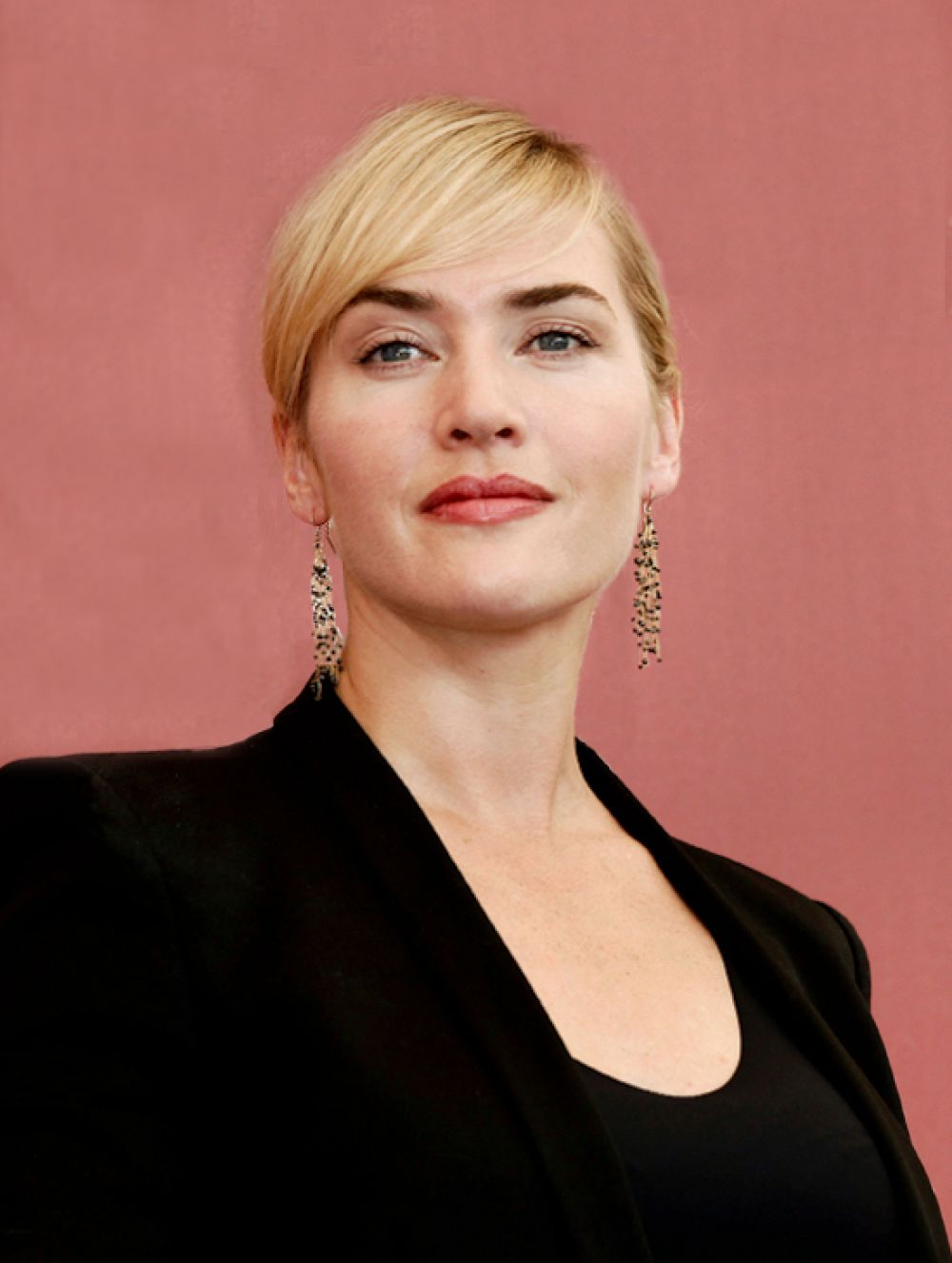
Kate Winslet won twice, for Sense and Sensibility (1995) and Steve Jobs (2015).

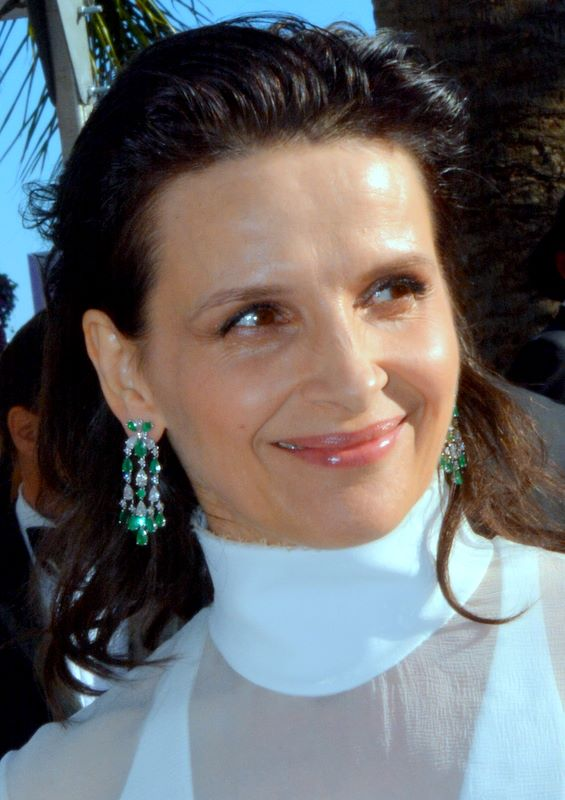
Juliette Binoche won for The English Patient (1996).

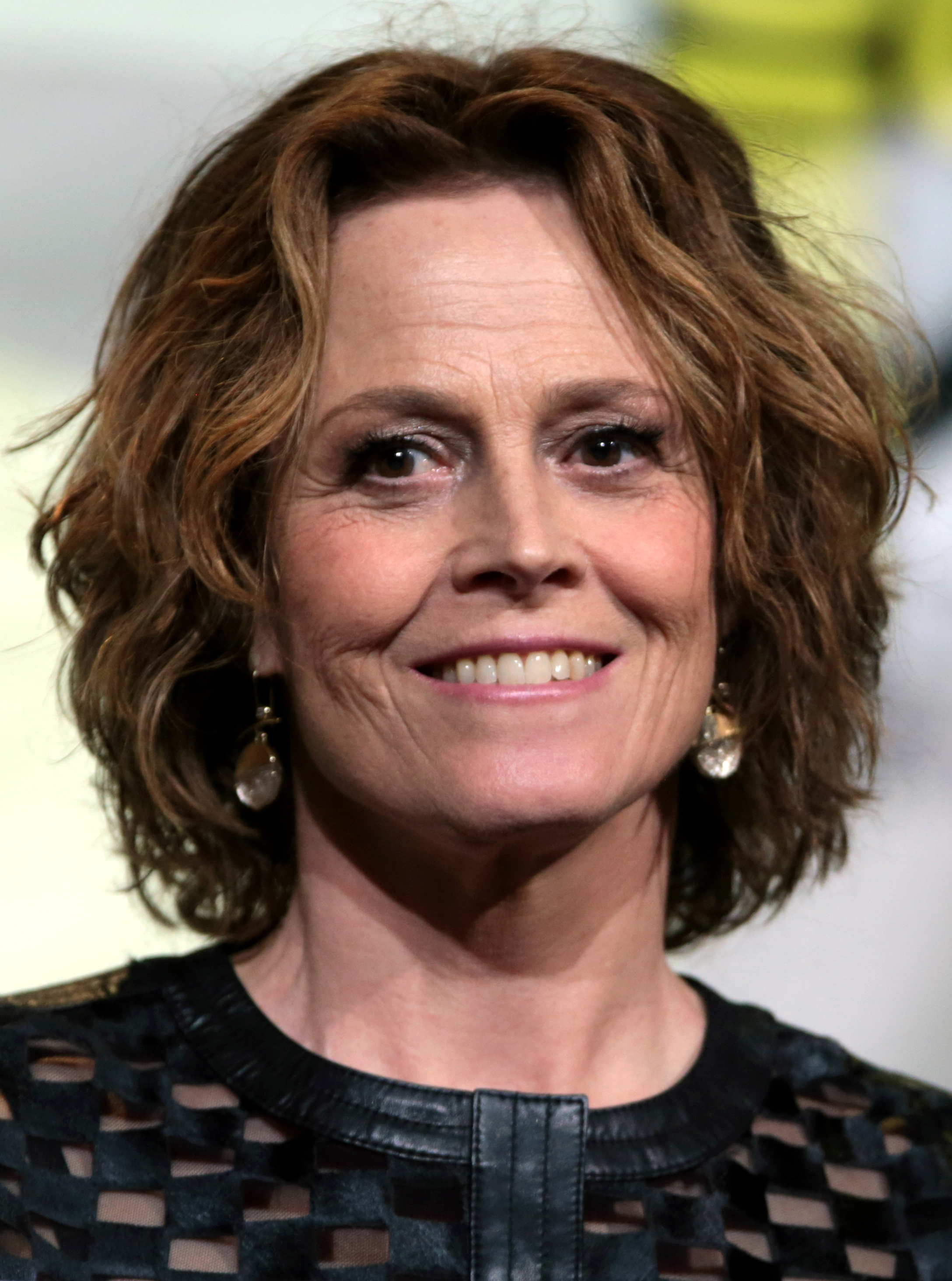
Sigourney Weaver won for The Ice Storm (1997).

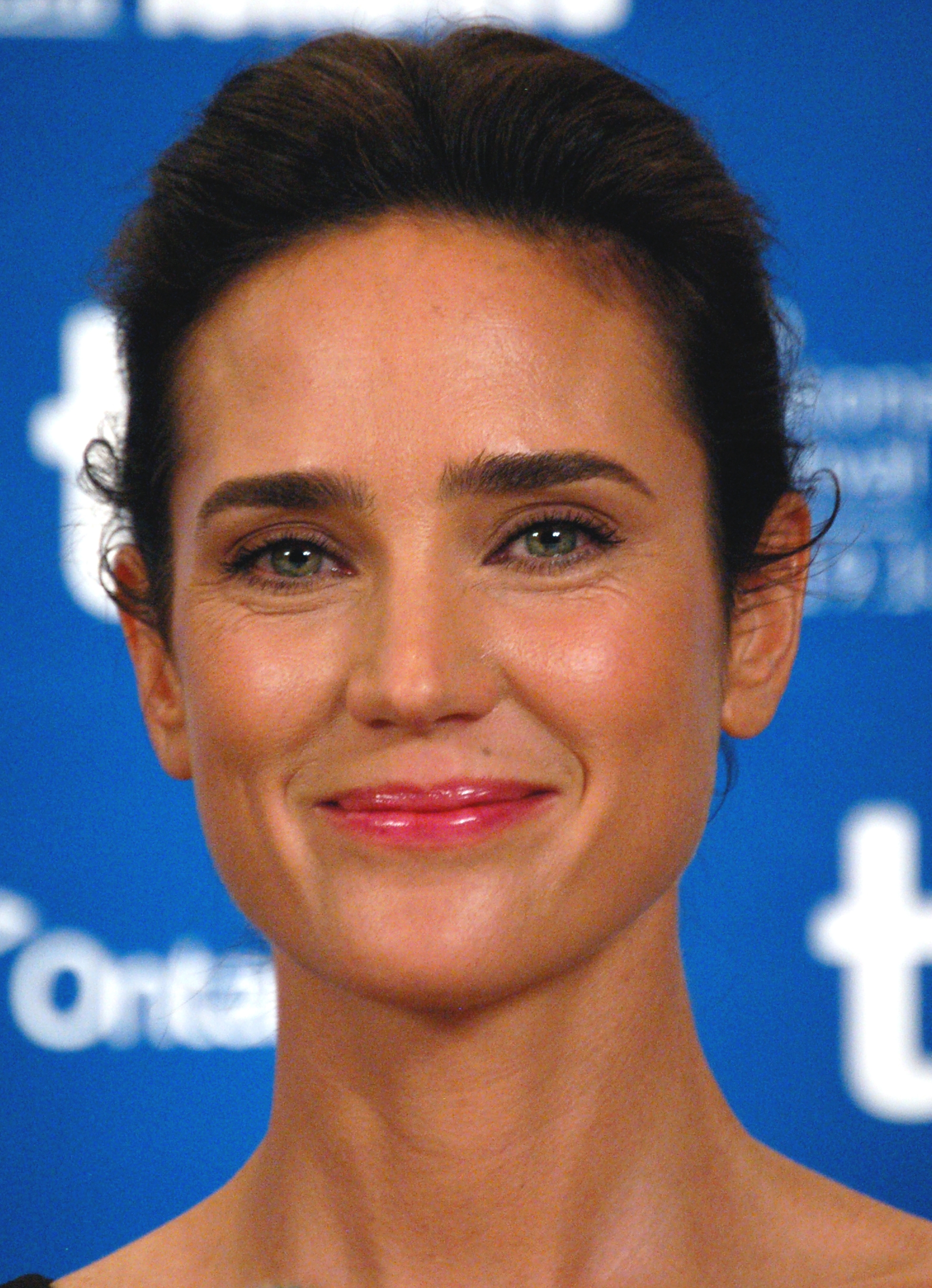
Jennifer Connelly won for A Beautiful Mind (2001).

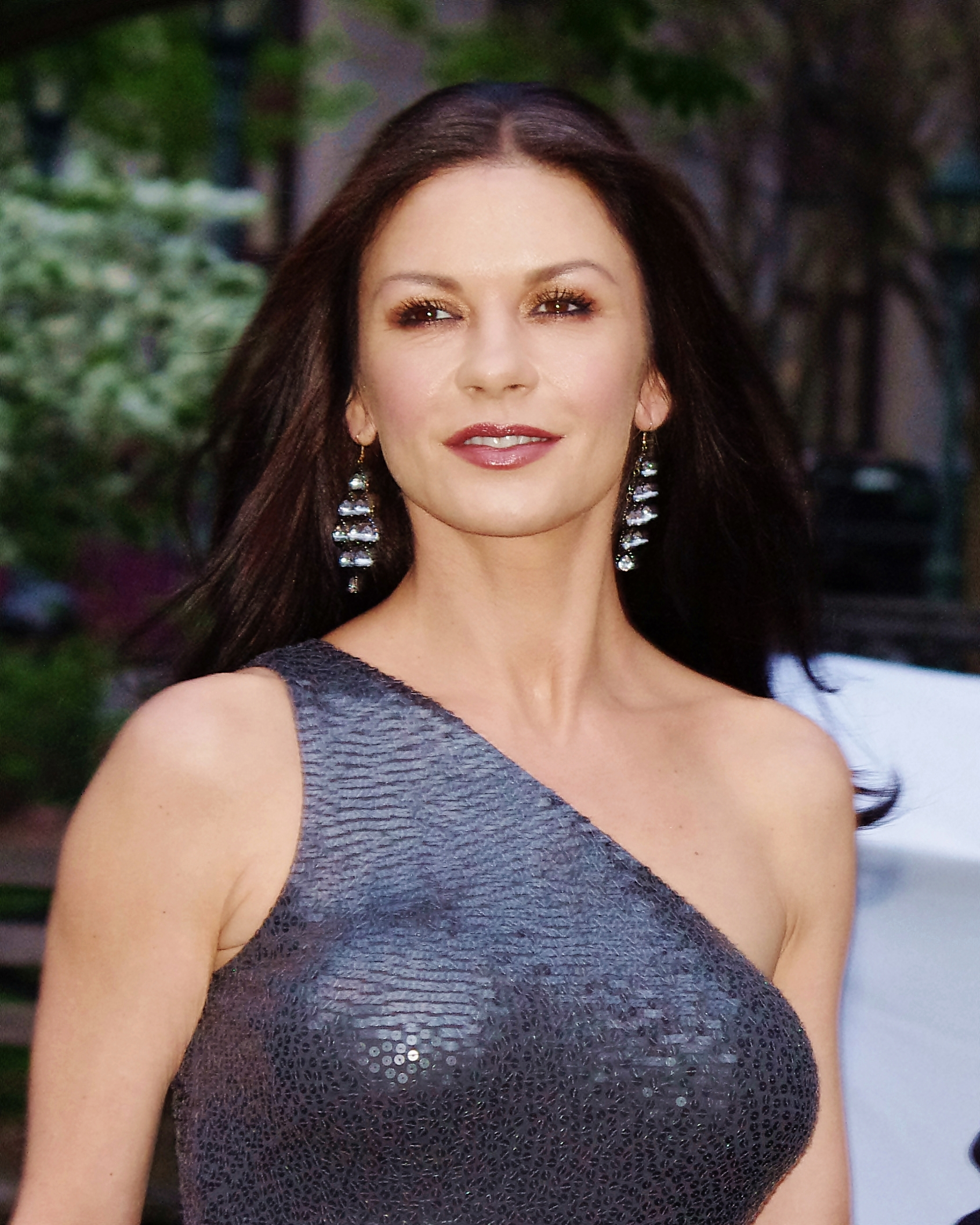
Catherine Zeta-Jones won for Chicago (2002).

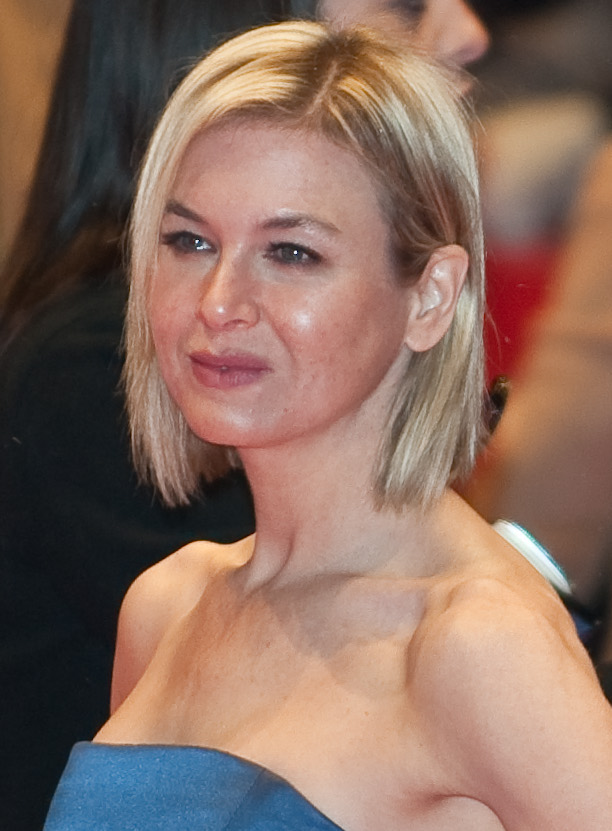
Renée Zellweger won for Cold Mountain (2003).

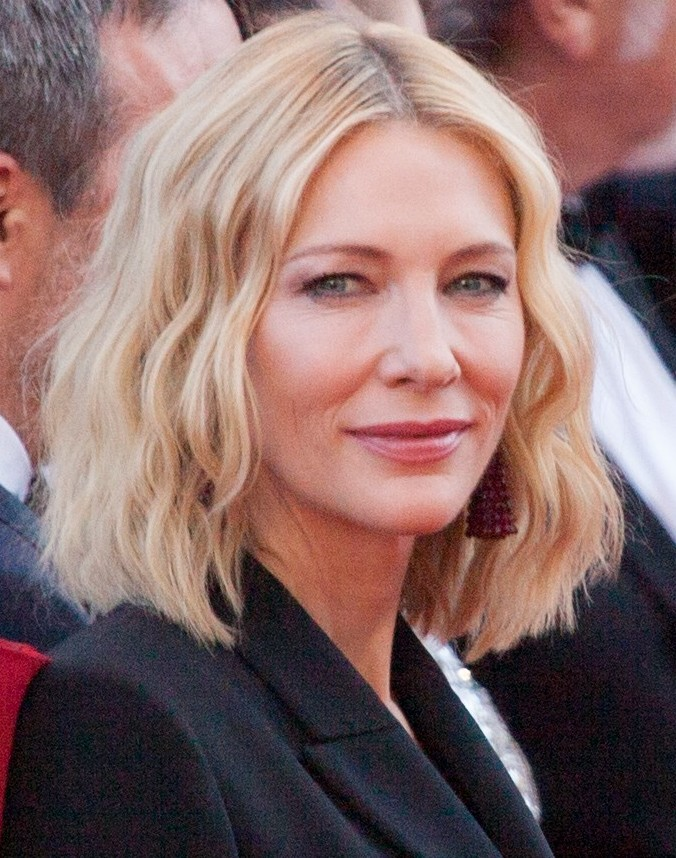
Cate Blanchett won, for The Aviator (2004).

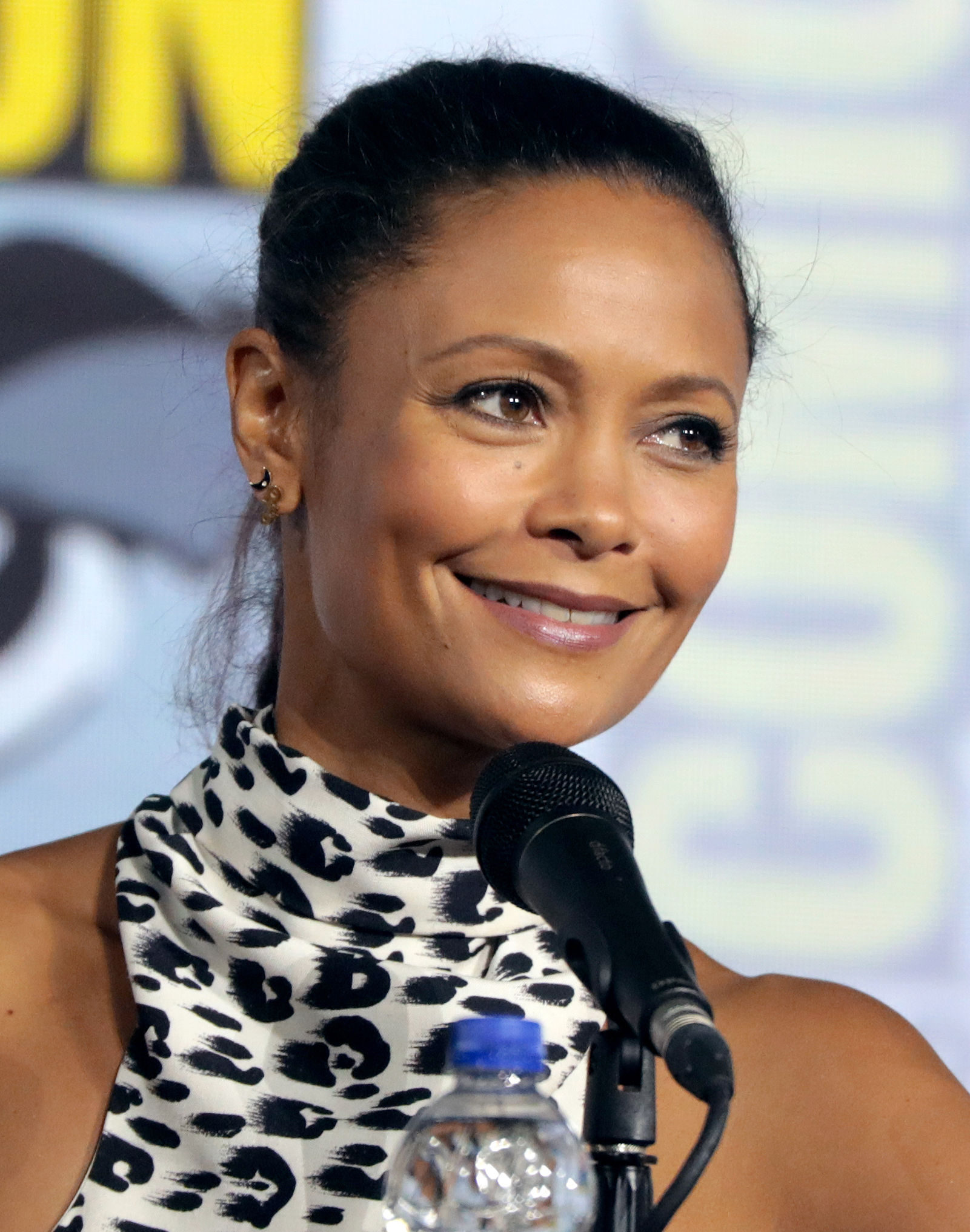
Thandiwe Newton won for Crash (2005).

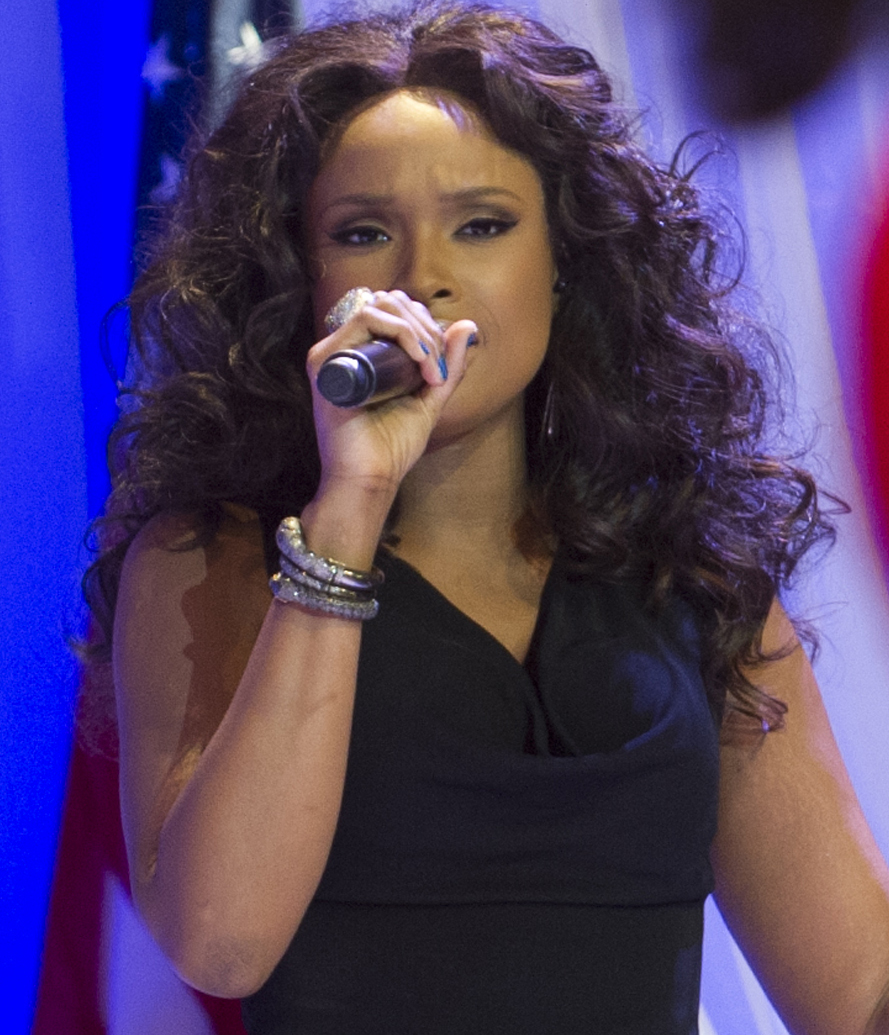
Jennifer Hudson won, in her acting debut, for Dreamgirls (2006).

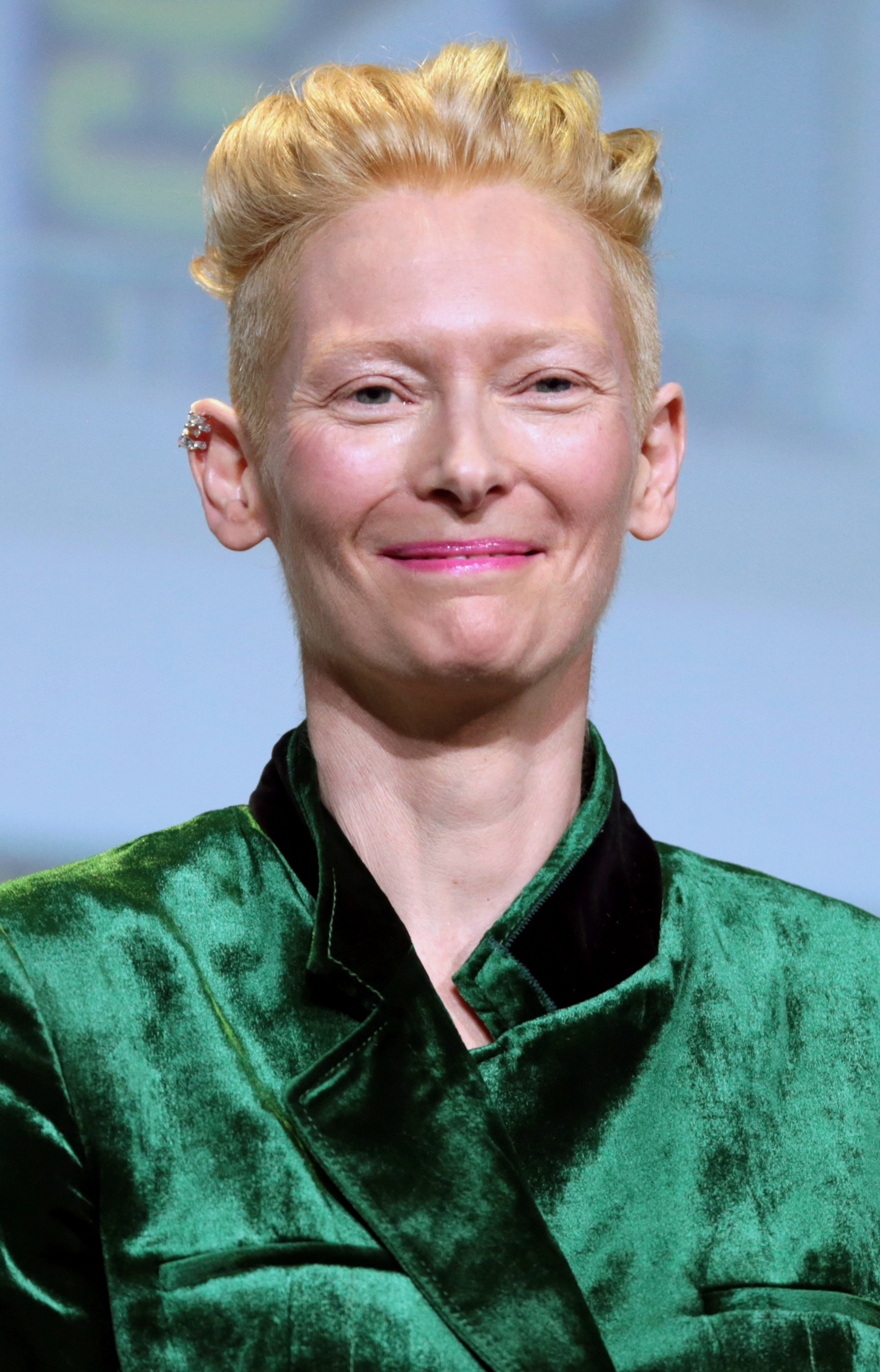
Tilda Swinton won for Michael Clayton (2007).

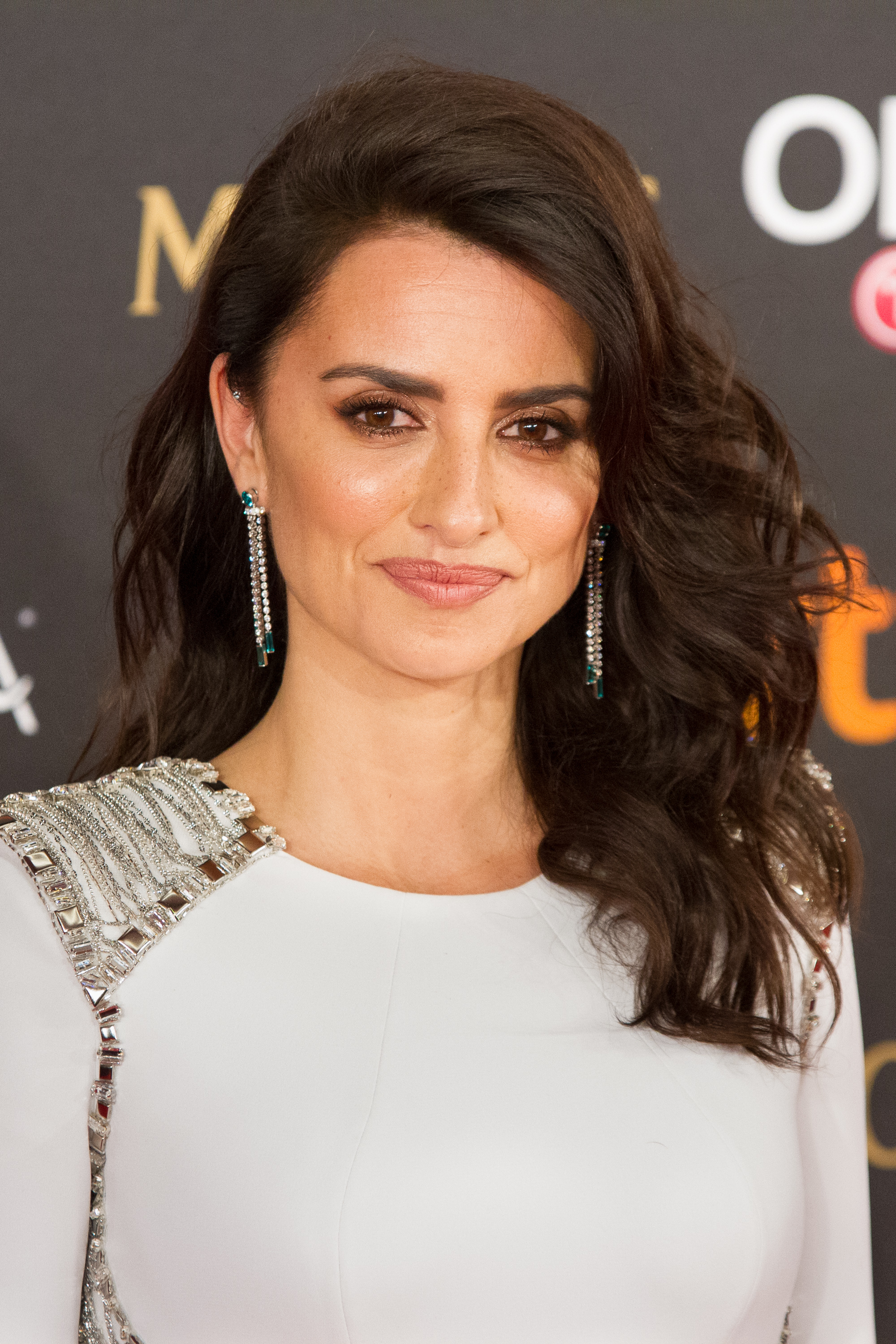
Penélope Cruz won for Vicky Cristina Barcelona (2008)

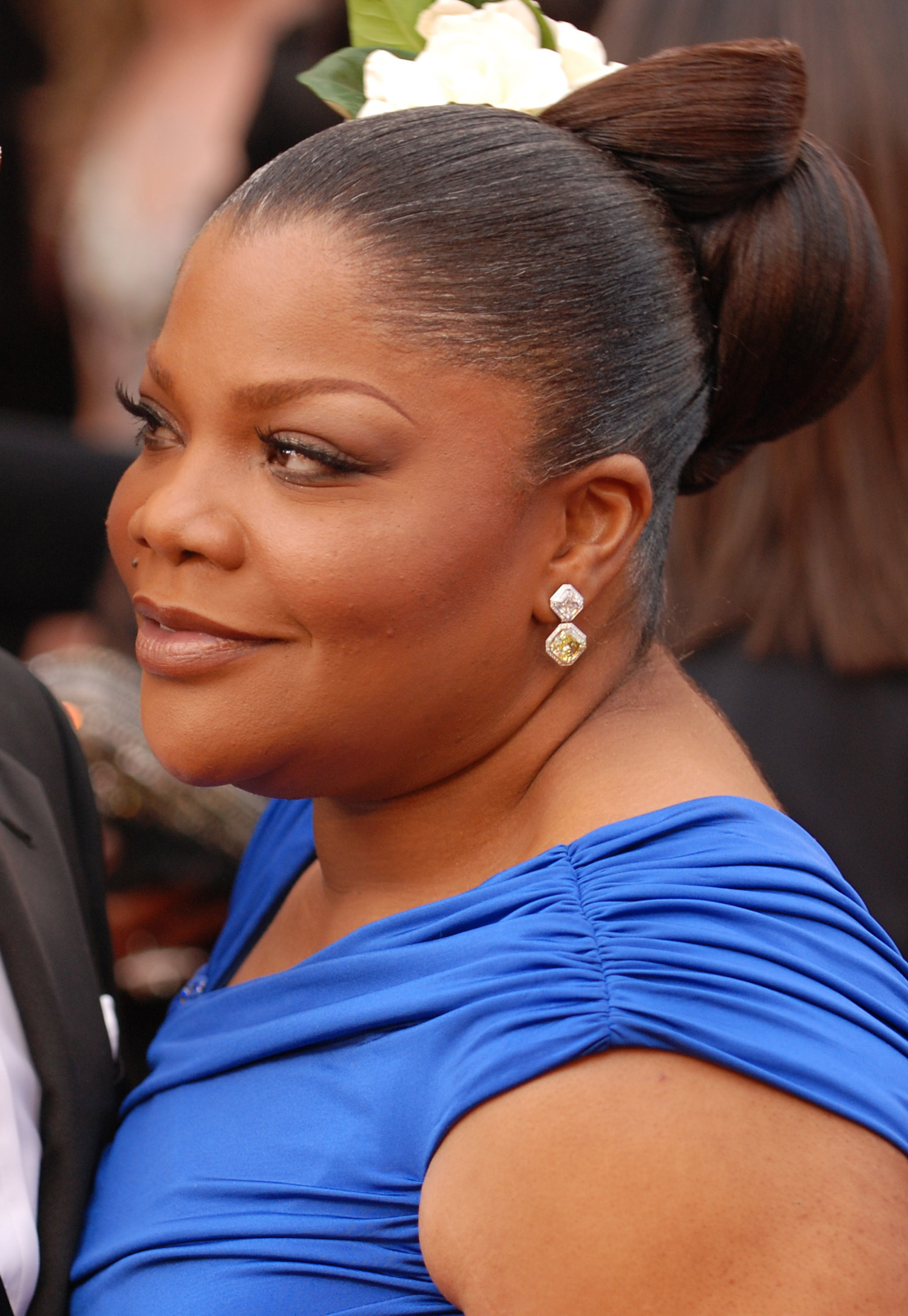
Mo'Nique won for Precious (2009).

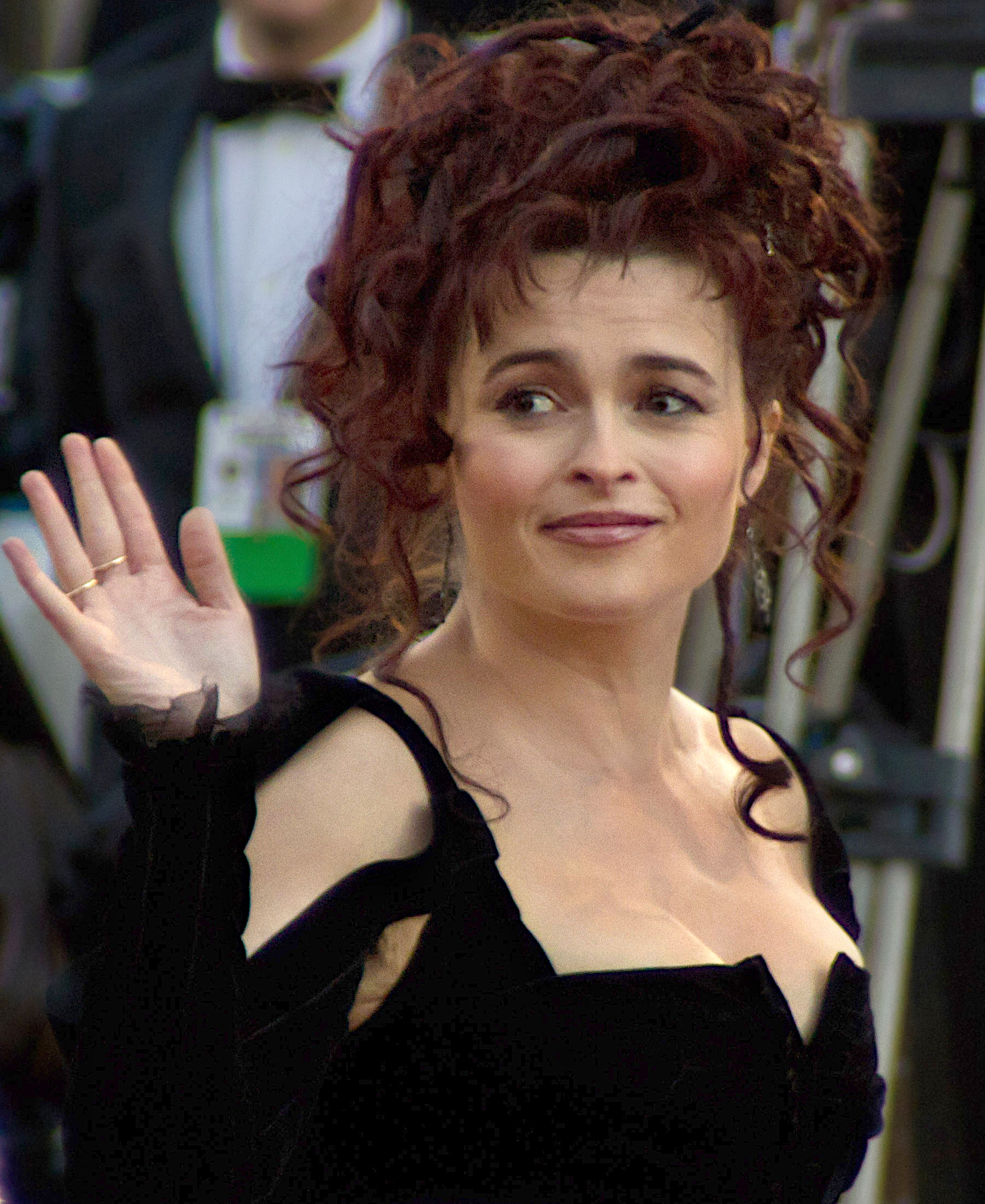
Helena Bonham Carter won for The King's Speech (2010).

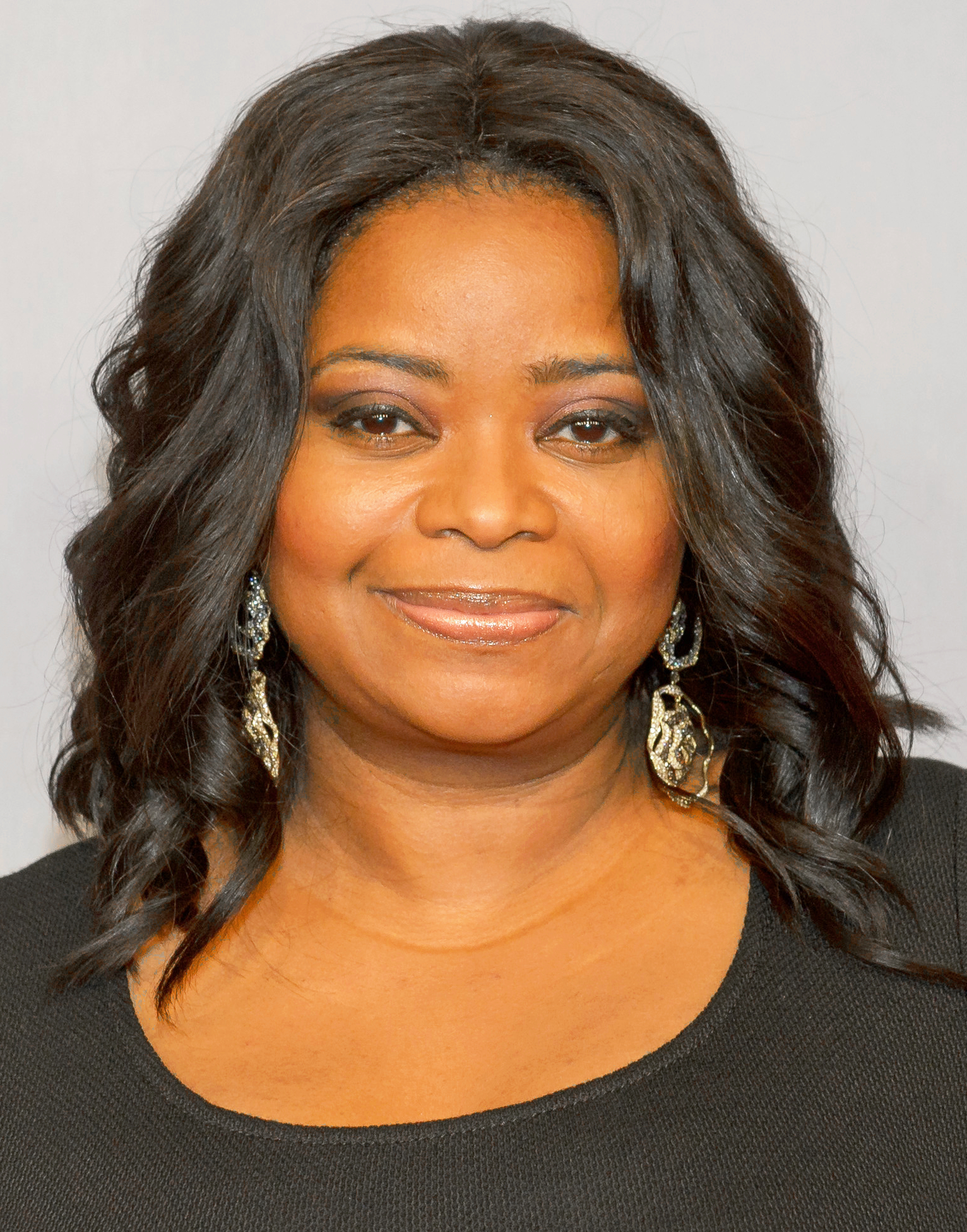
Octavia Spencer won for The Help (2011).

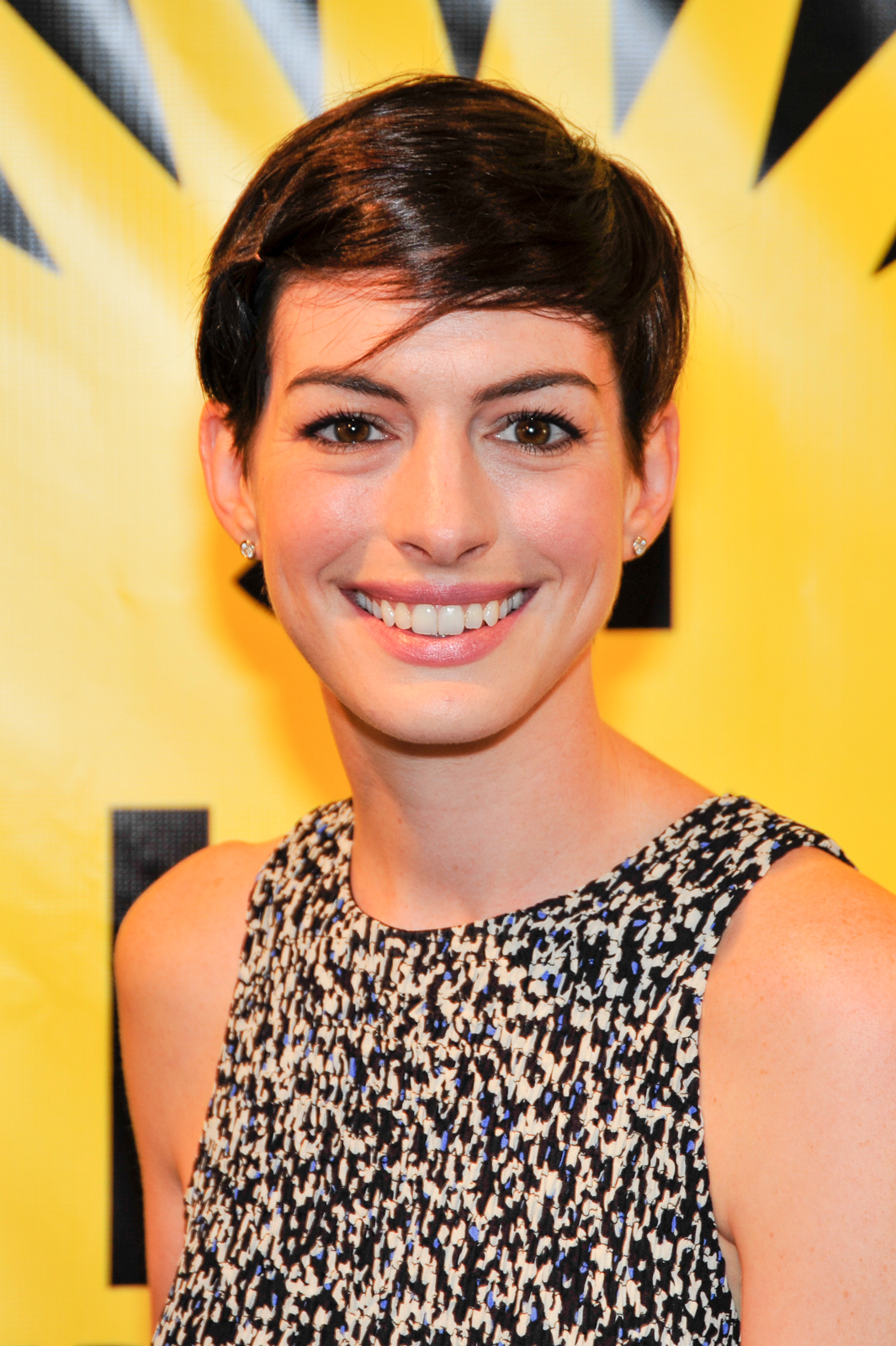
Anne Hathaway won for Les Misérables (2012).

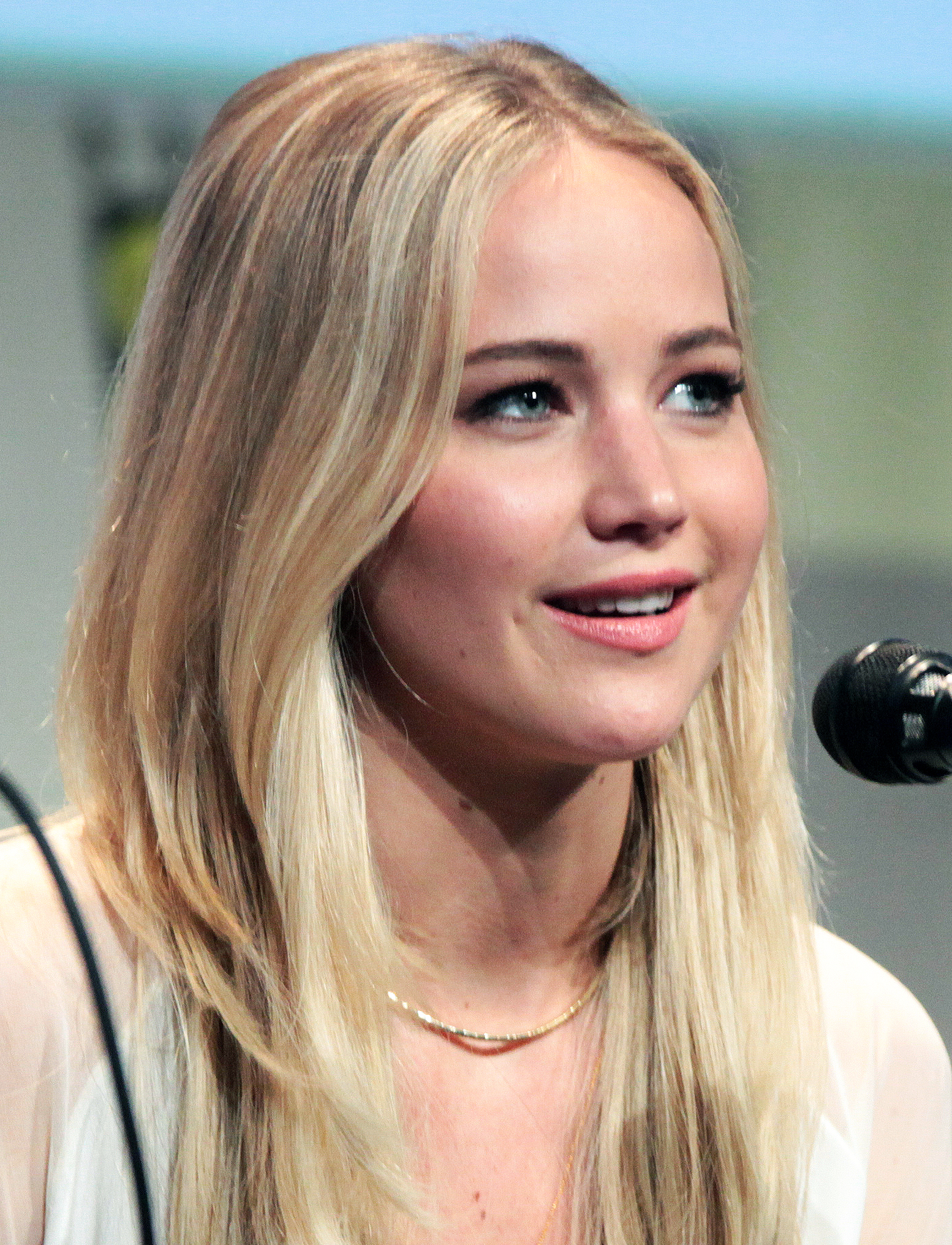
Jennifer Lawrence won for American Hustle (2013).

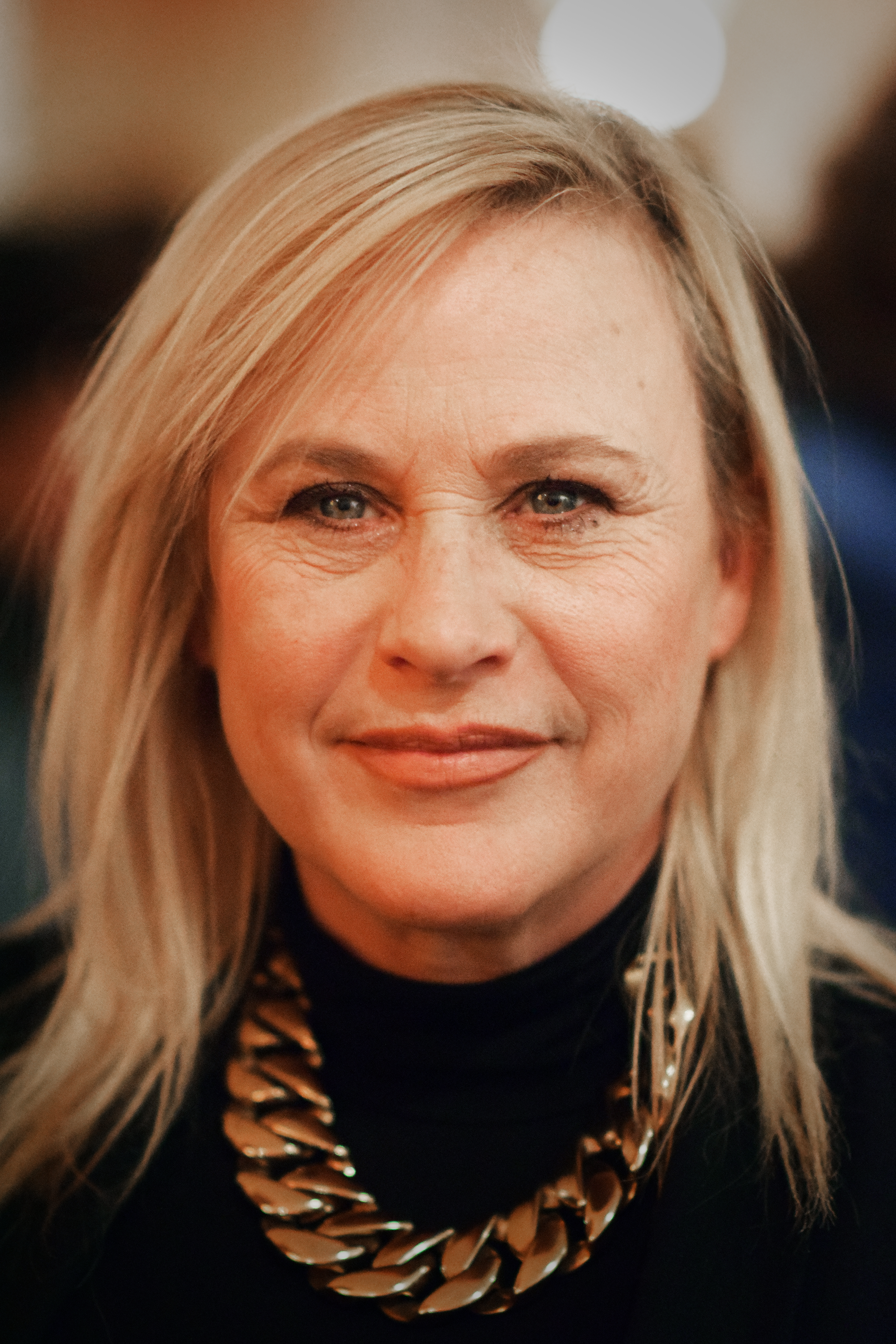
Patricia Arquette won for Boyhood (2014).

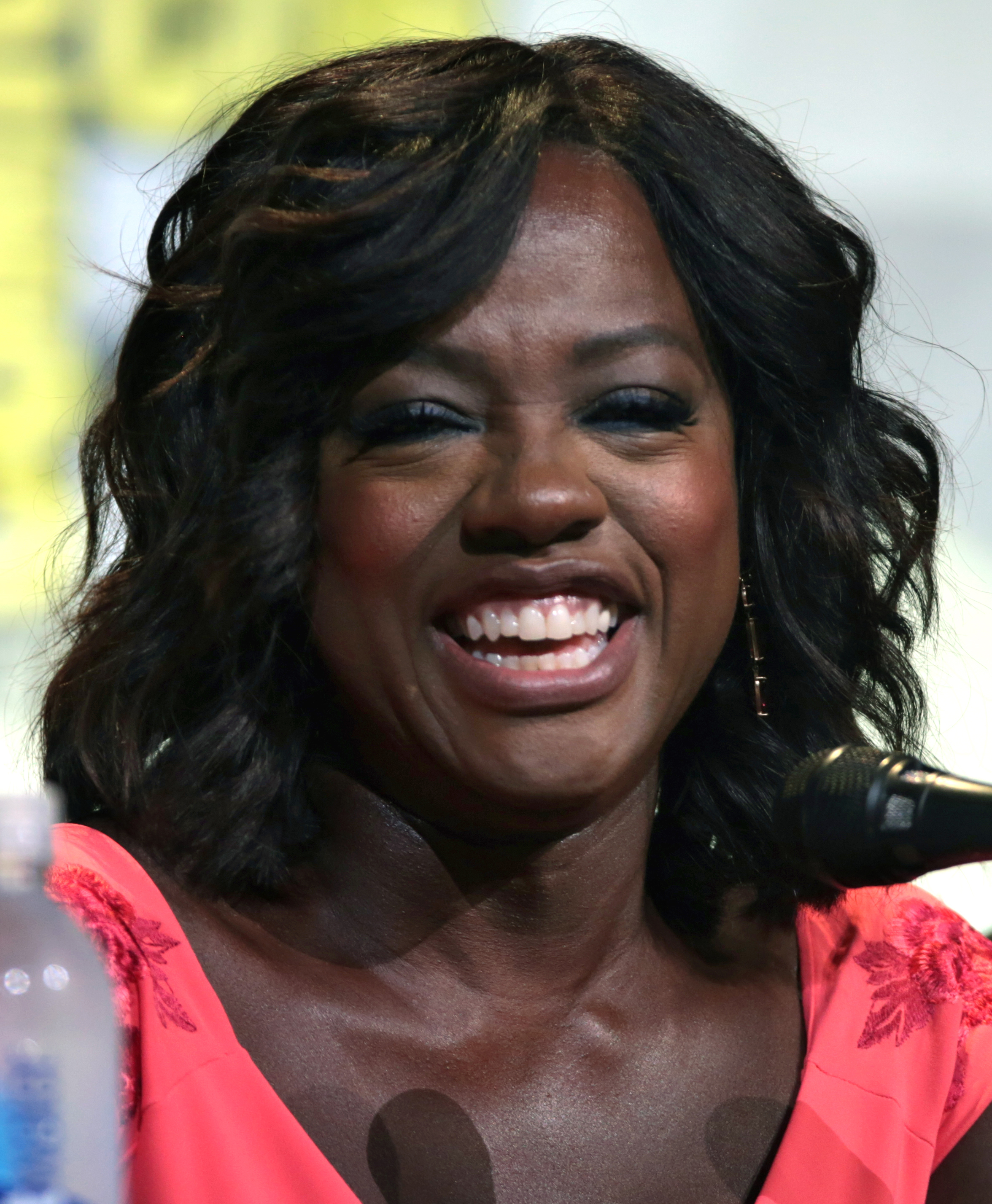
Viola Davis won for Fences (2016).

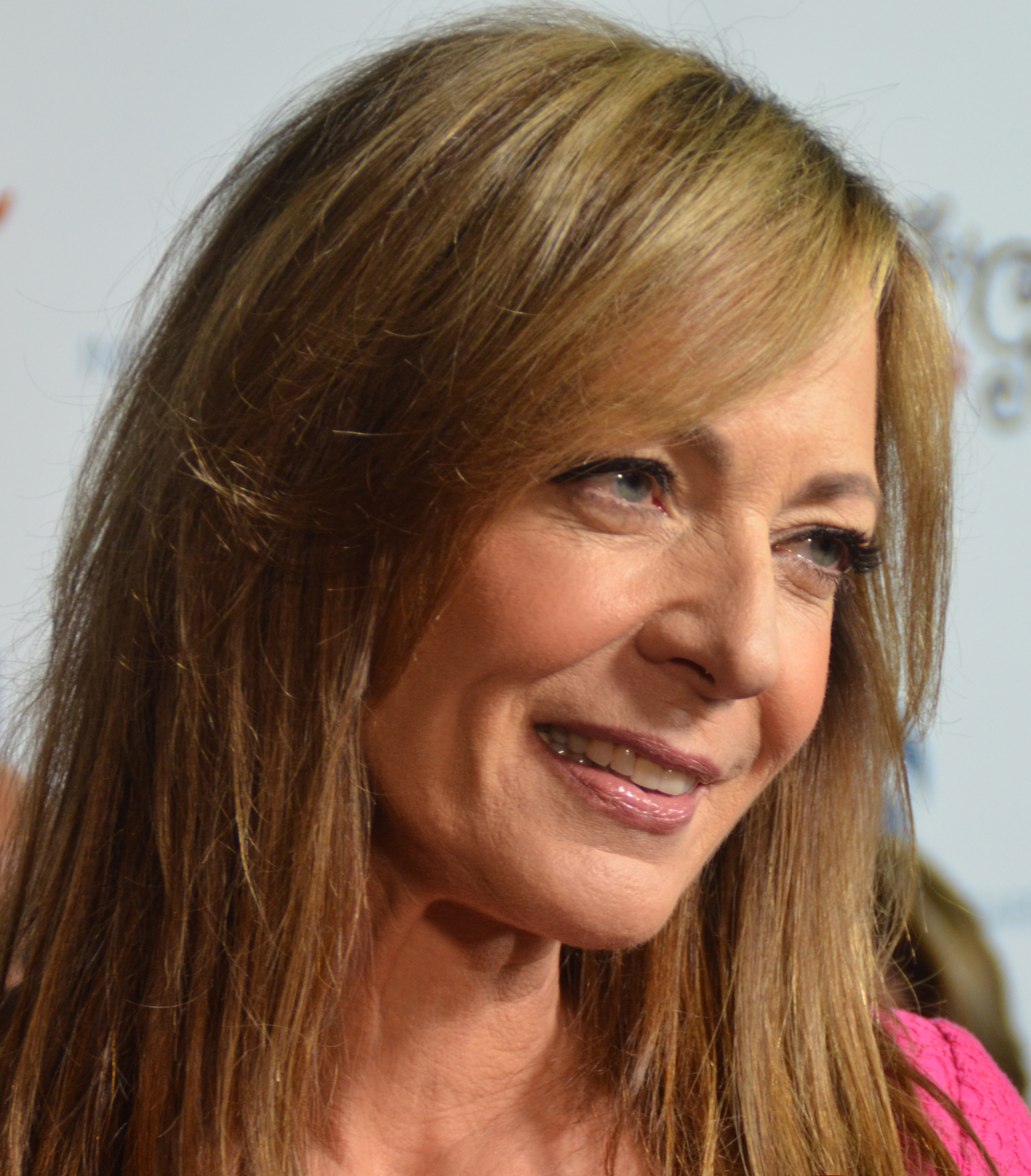
Allison Janney won for I, Tonya (2017).

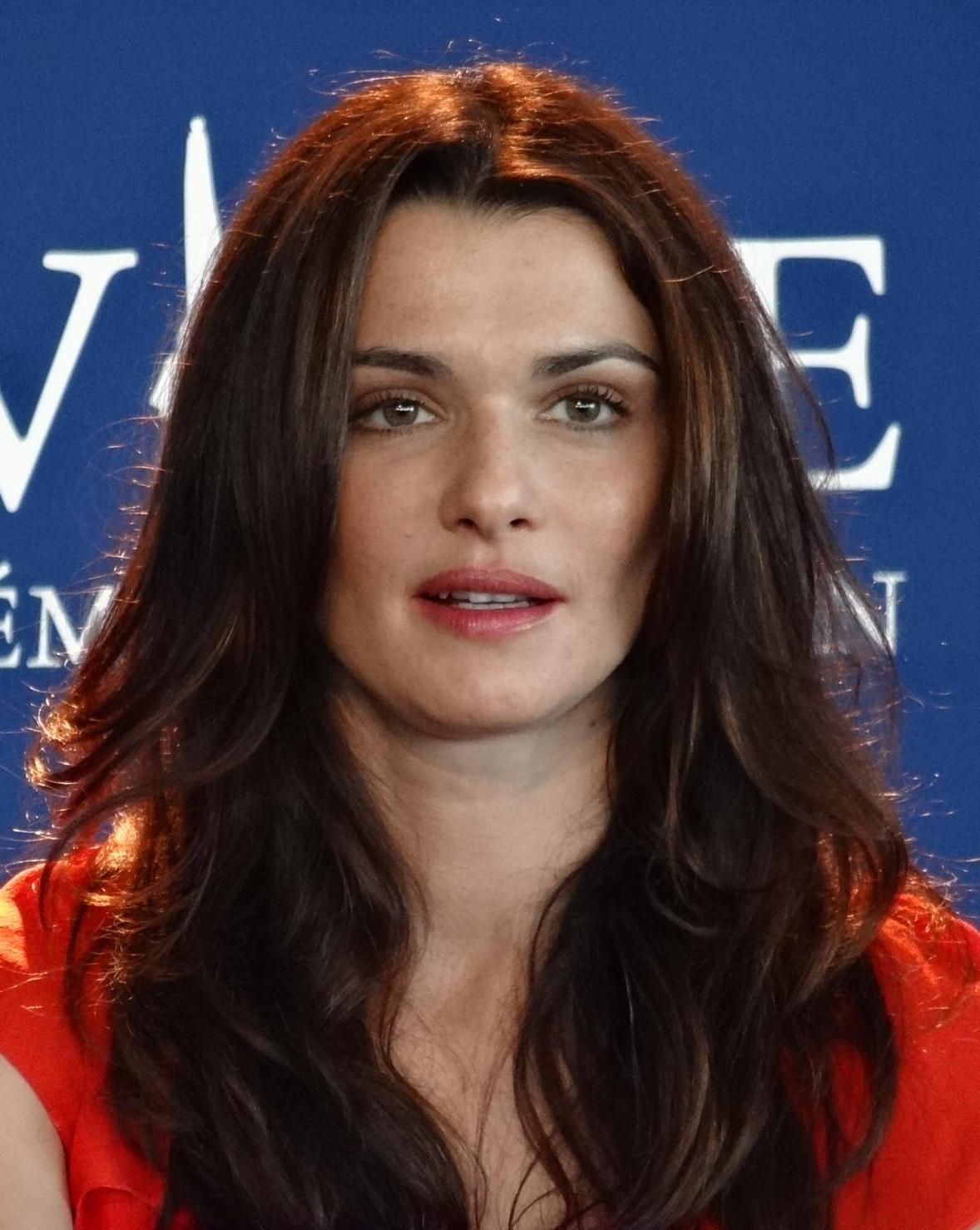
Rachel Weisz won for The Favourite (2018).

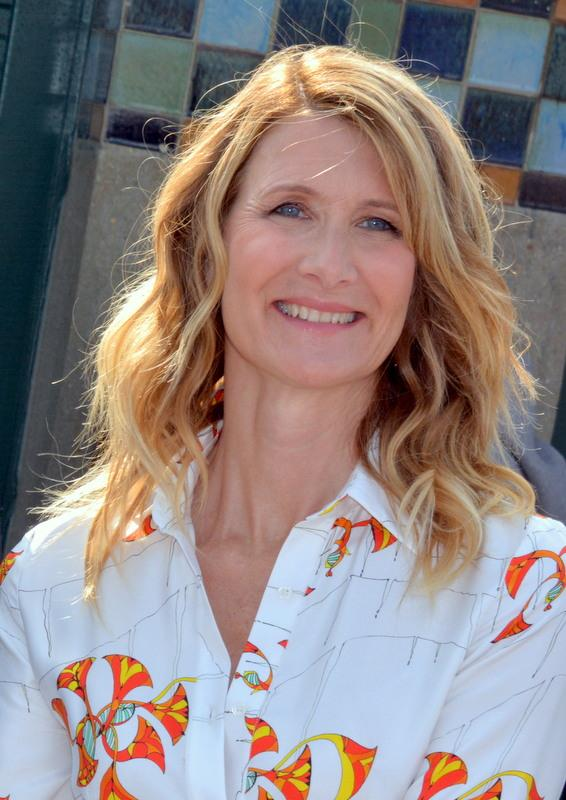
Laura Dern won for Marriage Story (2019).

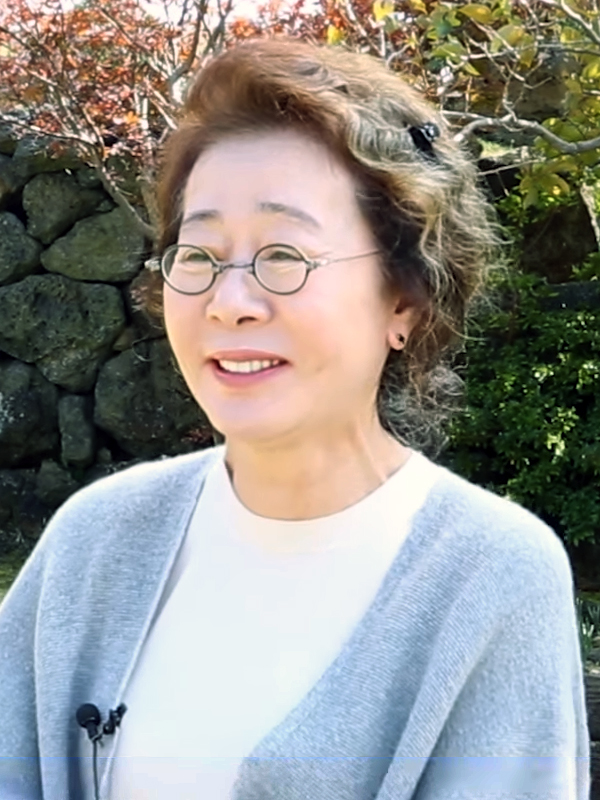
Youn Yuh-jung at age 73 won for Minari (2020)

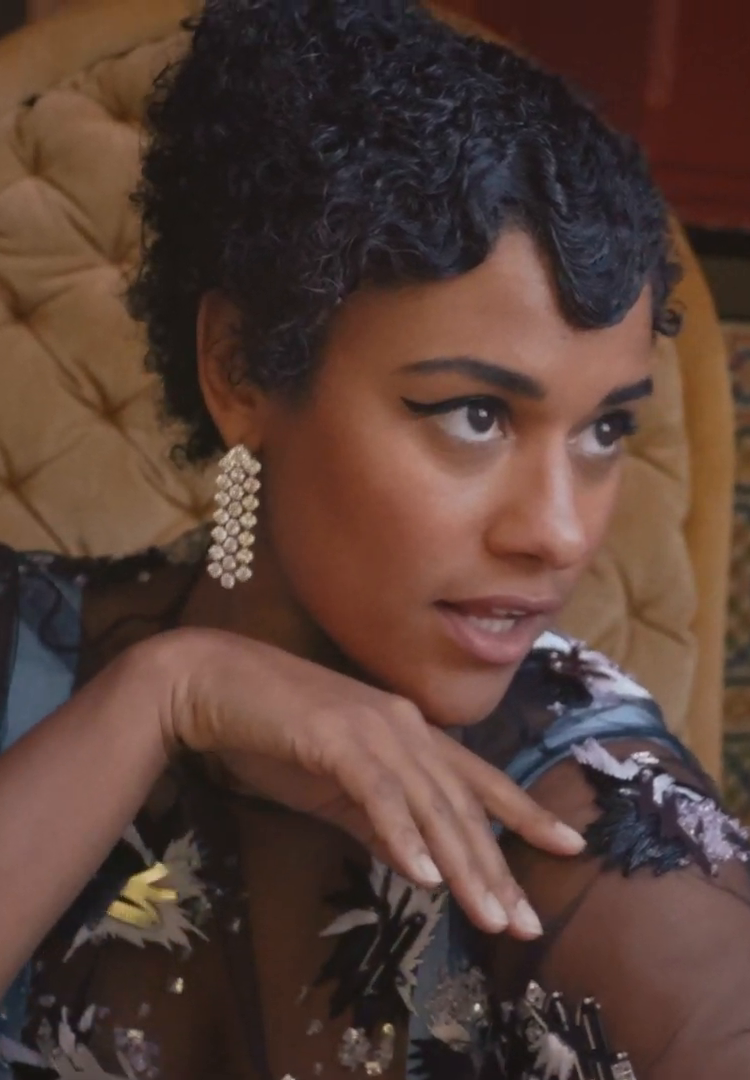
Ariana DeBose won for West Side Story (2021).

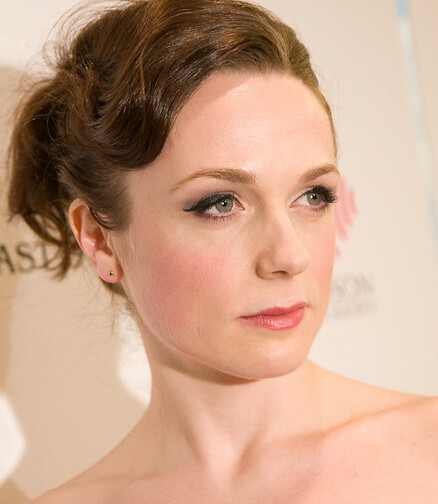
Kerry Condon won for The Banshees of Inisherin (2022).

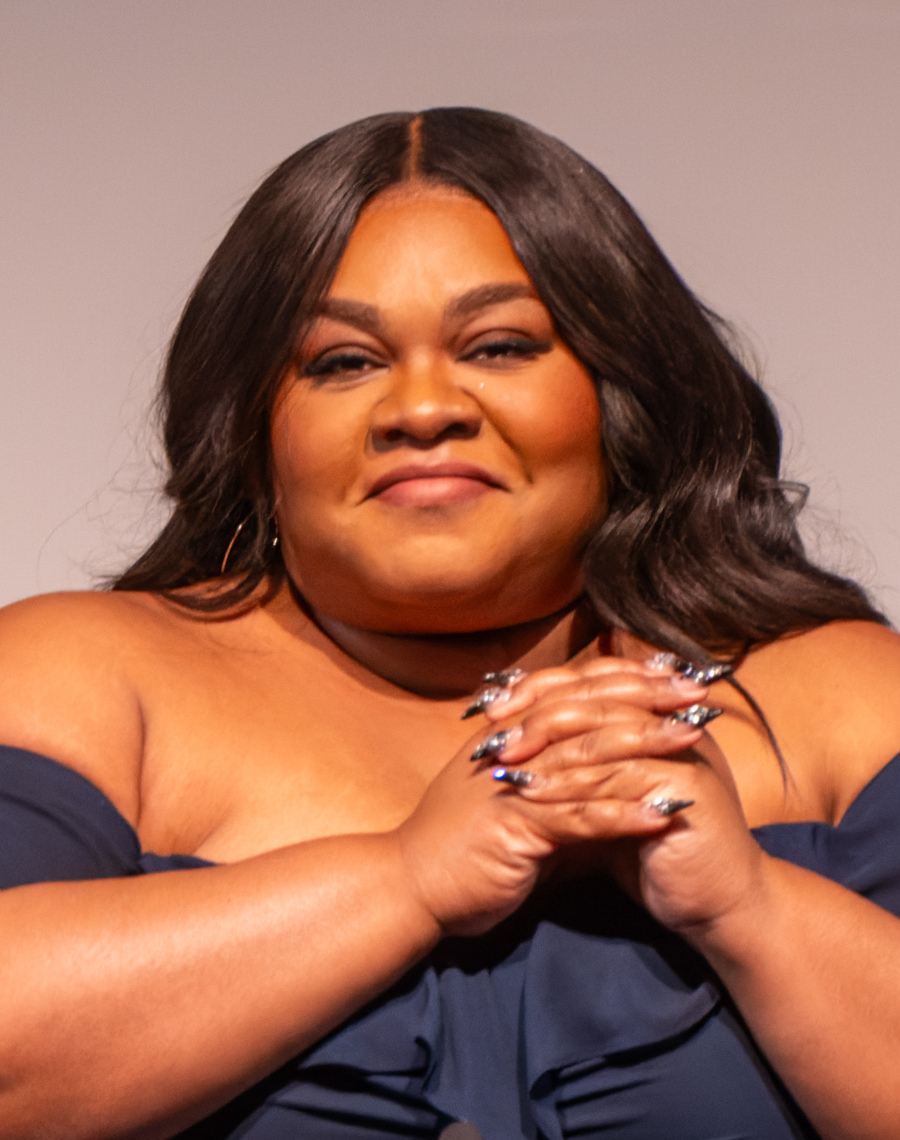
Da'Vine Joy Randolph won for The Holdovers (2023).

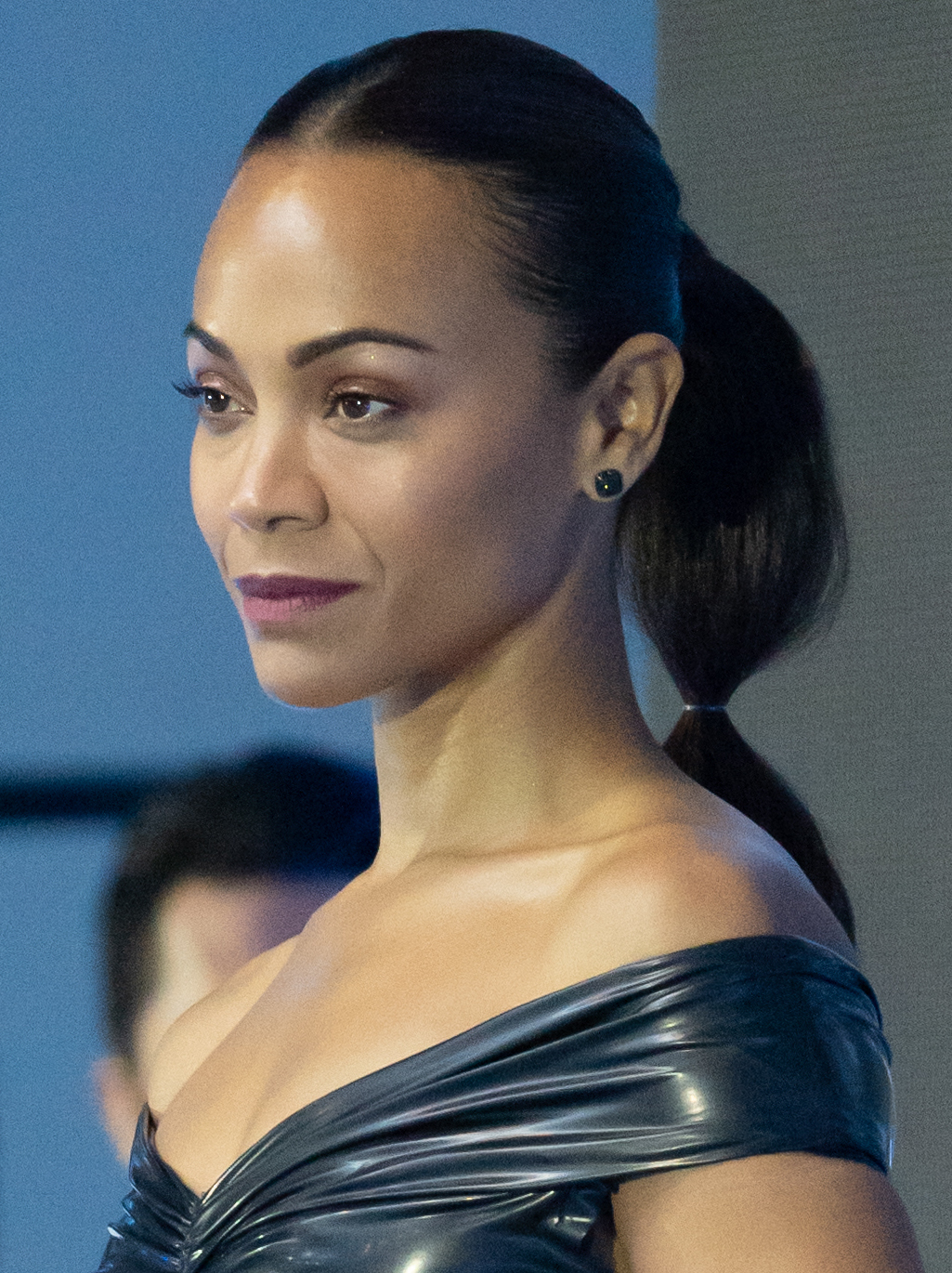
Zoe Saldaña won for Emilia Pérez (2024).

=== 1960s ===
Year	Actor	Role(s)	Film	Ref.
**1968** (22nd)	**Billie Whitelaw ^{[A]}**	**Charlie Bubbles**	**Lottie Bubbles**	
**1968** (22nd)	**Billie Whitelaw ^{[A]}**	**Twisted Nerve**	**Joan Harper**	
**1968** (22nd)	Pat Heywood	Romeo and Juliet	The Nurse	
**1968** (22nd)	Virginia Maskell	Interlude	Antonia	
**1968** (22nd)	Simone Signoret	Games	Lisa Schindler	
**1969** (23rd)	**Celia Johnson**	**The Prime of Miss Jean Brodie**	**Miss Mackay**	
**1969** (23rd)	Peggy Ashcroft	Three into Two Won't Go	Belle	
**1969** (23rd)	Pamela Franklin	The Prime of Miss Jean Brodie	Sandy	
**1969** (23rd)	Mary Wimbush	Oh! What a Lovely War	Mary Smith	

=== 1970s ===
Year	Actor	Role(s)	Film	Ref.
**1970** (24th)	**Susannah York**	**They Shoot Horses, Don't They?**	**Alice LeBlanc**	
**1970** (24th)	Evin Crowley	Ryan's Daughter	Maureen	
**1970** (24th)	Estelle Parsons	Watermelon Man	Althea Gerber	
**1970** (24th)	Maureen Stapleton	Airport	Inez Guerrero	
**1971** (25th)	**Margaret Leighton**	**The Go-Between**	**Mrs. Maudsley**	
**1971** (25th)	Jane Asher	Deep End	Susan	
**1971** (25th)	Georgia Brown	The Raging Moon	Sarah Charles	
**1971** (25th)	Georgia Engel	Taking Off	Margot	
**1972** (26th)	**Cloris Leachman** †	**The Last Picture Show**	**Ruth Popper**	
**1972** (26th)	Marisa Berenson	Cabaret	Natalia Landauer	
**1972** (26th)	Eileen Brennan	The Last Picture Show	Genevieve Morgan	
**1972** (26th)	Shelley Winters	The Poseidon Adventure	Belle Rosen	
**1973** (27th)	**Valentina Cortese**	**Day for Night**	**Severine**	
**1973** (27th)	Rosemary Leach	That'll Be the Day	Mary Maclaine	
**1973** (27th)	Delphine Seyrig	The Day of the Jackal	Colette de Montpellier	
**1973** (27th)	Ingrid Thulin	Cries and Whispers	Karin	
**1974** (28th)	**Ingrid Bergman** †	**Murder on the Orient Express**	**Greta Ohlsson**	
**1974** (28th)	Sylvia Sidney	Summer Wishes, Winter Dreams	Mrs. Pritchett	
**1974** (28th)	Sylvia Syms	The Tamarind Seed	Margaret Stephenson	
**1974** (28th)	Cindy Williams	American Graffiti	Laurie Henderson	
**1975** (29th)	**Diane Ladd**	**Alice Doesn't Live Here Anymore**	**Flo Castleberry**	
**1975** (29th)	Ronee Blakley	Nashville	Barbara Jean	
**1975** (29th)	Lelia Goldoni	Alice Doesn't Live Here Anymore	Bea	
**1975** (29th)	Gwen Welles	Nashville	Sueleen Gay	
**1976** (30th)	**Jodie Foster ^{[A]}**	**Bugsy Malone**	**Tallulah**	
**1976** (30th)	**Jodie Foster ^{[A]}**	**Taxi Driver**	**Iris Steensma**	
**1976** (30th)	Annette Crosbie	The Slipper and the Rose	The Fairy Godmother	
**1976** (30th)	Vivien Merchant	The Homecoming	Ruth	
**1976** (30th)	Billie Whitelaw	The Omen	Mrs. Baylock	
**1977** (31st)	**Jenny Agutter**	**Equus**	**Julie Mason**	
**1977** (31st)	Geraldine Chaplin	Welcome to L.A.	Karen Hood	
**1977** (31st)	Joan Plowright	Equus	Dora Strang	
**1977** (31st)	Shelley Winters	Next Stop, Greenwich Village	Fay Lapinsky	
**1978** (32nd)	**Geraldine Page**	**Interiors**	**Eve**	
**1978** (32nd)	Angela Lansbury	Death on the Nile	Salome Otterbourne	
**1978** (32nd)	Maggie Smith	Death on the Nile	Miss Bowers	
**1978** (32nd)	Mona Washbourne	Stevie	Aunt	
**1979** (33rd)	**Rachel Roberts**	**Yanks**	**Clarrie Moreton**	
**1979** (33rd)	Lisa Eichhorn	The Europeans	Gertrude Wentworth	
**1979** (33rd)	Mariel Hemingway	Manhattan	Tracy	
**1979** (33rd)	Meryl Streep	Manhattan	Jill Davis	

=== 1980s ===
Year	Actor	Role(s)	Film	Ref.
**1980** (34th)	**Not awarded**			
**1981** (35th)	**Not awarded**			
**1982** (36th)	**Rohini Hattangadi (TIE) ^{[B]}**	**Gandhi**	**Kasturba Gandhi**	
**1982** (36th)	**Maureen Stapleton † (TIE) ^{[B]}**	**Reds**	**Emma Goldman**	
**1982** (36th)	Candice Bergen	Gandhi	Margaret Bourke-White	
**1982** (36th)	Jane Fonda	On Golden Pond	Chelsea Thayer	
**1983** (37th)	**Jamie Lee Curtis**	**Trading Places**	**Ophelia**	
**1983** (37th)	Teri Garr	Tootsie	Sandy Lester	
**1983** (37th)	Rosemary Harris	The Ploughman's Lunch	Ann Barrington	
**1983** (37th)	Maureen Lipman	Educating Rita	Trish	
**1984** (38th)	**Liz Smith**	**A Private Function**	**Mrs. Chilvers**	
**1984** (38th)	Eileen Atkins	The Dresser	Madge	
**1984** (38th)	Cher	Silkwood	Dolly Pelliker	
**1984** (38th)	Tuesday Weld	Once Upon a Time in America	Carol	
**1985** (39th)	**Rosanna Arquette**	**Desperately Seeking Susan**	**Roberta Glass**	
**1985** (39th)	Judi Dench	Wetherby	Marcia Pilborough	
**1985** (39th)	Anjelica Huston †	Prizzi's Honor	Maerose Prizzi	
**1985** (39th)	Tracey Ullman	Plenty	Alice Park	
**1986** (40th)	**Judi Dench**	**A Room with a View**	**Eleanor Lavish**	
**1986** (40th)	Rosanna Arquette	After Hours	Marcy Franklin	
**1986** (40th)	Barbara Hershey	Hannah and Her Sisters	Lee	
**1986** (40th)	Rosemary Leach	A Room with a View	Mrs. Honeychurch	
**1987** (41st)	**Susan Wooldridge**	**Hope and Glory**	**Molly**	
**1987** (41st)	Judi Dench	84 Charing Cross Road	Nora Doel	
**1987** (41st)	Vanessa Redgrave	Prick up Your Ears	Peggy Ramsay	
**1987** (41st)	Dianne Wiest	Radio Days	Bea	
**1988** (42nd)	**Judi Dench**	**A Handful of Dust**	**Mrs. Beaver**	
**1988** (42nd)	Maria Aitken	A Fish Called Wanda	Wendy Leach	
**1988** (42nd)	Anne Archer	Fatal Attraction	Beth Gallagher	
**1988** (42nd)	Olympia Dukakis †	Moonstruck	Rose Castorini	
**1989** (43rd)	**Michelle Pfeiffer**	**Dangerous Liaisons**	**Madame de Tourvel**	
**1989** (43rd)	Peggy Ashcroft	Madame Sousatzka	Lady Emily	
**1989** (43rd)	Laura San Giacomo	Sex, Lies, and Videotape	Cynthia Bishop	
**1989** (43rd)	Sigourney Weaver	Working Girl	Katharine Parker	

=== 1990s ===
Year	Actor	Role(s)	Film	Ref.
**1990** (44th)	**Whoopi Goldberg** †	**Ghost**	**Oda Mae Brown**	
**1990** (44th)	Anjelica Huston	Crimes and Misdemeanors	Dolores Paley	
**1990** (44th)	Shirley MacLaine	Steel Magnolias	Ouiser Boudreaux	
**1990** (44th)	Billie Whitelaw	The Krays	Violet Kray	
**1991** (45th)	**Kate Nelligan**	**Frankie and Johnny**	**Cora**	
**1991** (45th)	Annette Bening	The Grifters	Myra Langtry	
**1991** (45th)	Amanda Plummer	The Fisher King	Lydia	
**1991** (45th)	Julie Walters	Stepping Out	Vera	
**1992** (46th)	**Miranda Richardson**	**Damage**	**Ingrid Fleming**	
**1992** (46th)	Kathy Bates	Fried Green Tomatoes	Evelyn Couch	
**1992** (46th)	Helena Bonham Carter	Howards End	Helen Schlegel	
**1992** (46th)	Miranda Richardson	The Crying Game	Jude	
**1993** (47th)	**Miriam Margolyes**	**The Age of Innocence**	**Mrs. Mingott**	
**1993** (47th)	Holly Hunter	The Firm	Tammy Hemphill	
**1993** (47th)	Winona Ryder	The Age of Innocence	May Welland	
**1993** (47th)	Maggie Smith	The Secret Garden	Mrs. Medlock	
**1994** (48th)	**Kristin Scott Thomas**	**Four Weddings and a Funeral**	**Fiona**	
**1994** (48th)	Charlotte Coleman	Four Weddings and a Funeral	Scarlet	
**1994** (48th)	Sally Field	Forrest Gump	Mrs. Gump	
**1994** (48th)	Anjelica Huston	Manhattan Murder Mystery	Marcia Fox	
**1995** (49th)	**Kate Winslet**	**Sense and Sensibility**	**Marianne Dashwood**	
**1995** (49th)	Joan Allen	Nixon	Pat Nixon	
**1995** (49th)	Mira Sorvino †	Mighty Aphrodite	Linda Ash	
**1995** (49th)	Elizabeth Spriggs	Sense and Sensibility	Mrs. Jennings	
**1996** (50th)	**Juliette Binoche** †	**The English Patient**	**Hana**	
**1996** (50th)	Lauren Bacall	The Mirror Has Two Faces	Hannah Morgan	
**1996** (50th)	Marianne Jean-Baptiste	Secrets & Lies	Hortense Cumberbatch	
**1996** (50th)	Lynn Redgrave	Shine	Gillian	
**1997** (51st)	**Sigourney Weaver**	**The Ice Storm**	**Janey Carver**	
**1997** (51st)	Jennifer Ehle	Wilde	Constance Lloyd Wilde	
**1997** (51st)	Lesley Sharp	The Full Monty	Jeanette	
**1997** (51st)	Zoe Wanamaker	Wilde	Ada Leverson	
**1998** (52nd)	**Judi Dench** †	**Shakespeare in Love**	**Queen Elizabeth I**	
**1998** (52nd)	Kathy Bates	Primary Colors	Libby Holden	
**1998** (52nd)	Brenda Blethyn	Little Voice	Mari Hoff	
**1998** (52nd)	Lynn Redgrave	Gods and Monsters	Hanna	
**1999** (53rd)	**Maggie Smith**	**Tea with Mussolini**	**Hester Random**	
**1999** (53rd)	Thora Birch	American Beauty	Jane Burnham	
**1999** (53rd)	Cate Blanchett	The Talented Mr. Ripley	Meredith Logue	
**1999** (53rd)	Cameron Diaz	Being John Malkovich	Lotte Schwartz	
**1999** (53rd)	Mena Suvari	American Beauty	Angela Hayes	

=== 2000s ===
Year	Actor	Role(s)	Film	Ref.
**2000** (54th)	**Julie Walters**	**Billy Elliot**	**Georgia Wilkinson**	
**2000** (54th)	Judi Dench	Chocolat	Armande Voizin	
**2000** (54th)	Frances McDormand	Almost Famous	Elaine Miller	
**2000** (54th)	Lena Olin	Chocolat	Josephine Muscat	
**2000** (54th)	Ziyi Zhang	Crouching Tiger, Hidden Dragon	Jen Yu	
**2001** (55th)	**Jennifer Connelly** †	**A Beautiful Mind**	**Alicia Nash**	
**2001** (55th)	Judi Dench	The Shipping News	Agnis Hamm	
**2001** (55th)	Helen Mirren	Gosford Park	Jane Wilson	
**2001** (55th)	Maggie Smith	Gosford Park	Constance Trentham	
**2001** (55th)	Kate Winslet	Iris	Young Iris Murdoch	
**2002** (56th)	**Catherine Zeta-Jones** †	**Chicago**	**Velma Kelly**	
**2002** (56th)	Toni Collette	About a Boy	Fiona Brewer	
**2002** (56th)	Julianne Moore	The Hours	Laura Brown	
**2002** (56th)	Queen Latifah	Chicago	Matron Mama Morton	
**2002** (56th)	Meryl Streep	Adaptation	Susan Orlean	
**2003** (57th)	**Renée Zellweger** †	**Cold Mountain**	**Ruby Thewes**	
**2003** (57th)	Holly Hunter	Thirteen	Melanie Freeland	
**2003** (57th)	Laura Linney	Mystic River	Annabeth Markum	
**2003** (57th)	Judy Parfitt	Girl with a Pearl Earring	Maria Thins	
**2003** (57th)	Emma Thompson	Love Actually	Karen	
**2004** (58th)	**Cate Blanchett** †	**The Aviator**	**Katharine Hepburn**	
**2004** (58th)	Julie Christie	Finding Neverland	Emma Wightwick du Maurier	
**2004** (58th)	Heather Craney	Vera Drake	Joyce Drake	
**2004** (58th)	Natalie Portman	Closer	Alice Ayres / Jane Jones	
**2004** (58th)	Meryl Streep	The Manchurian Candidate	Eleanor Shaw	
**2005** (59th)	**Thandiwe Newton**	**Crash**	**Christine Thayer**	
**2005** (59th)	Brenda Blethyn	Pride & Prejudice	Mrs. Bennet	
**2005** (59th)	Catherine Keener	Capote	Harper Lee	
**2005** (59th)	Frances McDormand	North Country	Glory Dodge	
**2005** (59th)	Michelle Williams	Brokeback Mountain	Alma Beers Del Mar	
**2006** (60th)	**Jennifer Hudson** †	**Dreamgirls**	**Effie White**	
**2006** (60th)	Emily Blunt	The Devil Wears Prada	Emily Charlton	
**2006** (60th)	Abigail Breslin	Little Miss Sunshine	Olive Hoover	
**2006** (60th)	Toni Collette	Little Miss Sunshine	Sheryl Hoover	
**2006** (60th)	Frances de la Tour	The History Boys	Dorothy Lintott	
**2007** (61st)	**Tilda Swinton** †	**Michael Clayton**	**Karen Crowder**	
**2007** (61st)	Cate Blanchett	I'm Not There	Jude Quinn	
**2007** (61st)	Kelly Macdonald	No Country for Old Men	Carla Jean Moss	
**2007** (61st)	Samantha Morton	Control	Deborah Woodruff Curtis	
**2007** (61st)	Saoirse Ronan	Atonement	Briony Tallis	
**2008** (62nd)	**Penélope Cruz** †	**Vicky Cristina Barcelona**	**María Elena**	
**2008** (62nd)	Amy Adams	Doubt	Sister James	
**2008** (62nd)	Freida Pinto	Slumdog Millionaire	Latika	
**2008** (62nd)	Tilda Swinton	Burn After Reading	Katie Cox	
**2008** (62nd)	Marisa Tomei	The Wrestler	Cassidy / Pam	
**2009** (63rd)	**Mo'Nique** †	**Precious**	**Mary Lee Johnston**	
**2009** (63rd)	Anne-Marie Duff	Nowhere Boy	Julia Lennon	
**2009** (63rd)	Vera Farmiga	Up in the Air	Alex Goran	
**2009** (63rd)	Anna Kendrick	Up in the Air	Natalie Keener	
**2009** (63rd)	Kristin Scott Thomas	Nowhere Boy	Mimi Smith	

=== 2010s ===
Year	Actor	Role(s)	Film	Ref.
**2010** (64th)	**Helena Bonham Carter**	**The King's Speech**	**Queen Elizabeth**	
**2010** (64th)	Amy Adams	The Fighter	Charlene Fleming	
**2010** (64th)	Barbara Hershey	Black Swan	Erica Sayers	
**2010** (64th)	Lesley Manville	Another Year	Mary Smith	
**2010** (64th)	Miranda Richardson	Made in Dagenham	Barbara Castle	
**2011** (65th)	**Octavia Spencer** †	**The Help**	**Minny Jackson**	
**2011** (65th)	Jessica Chastain	The Help	Celia Foote	
**2011** (65th)	Judi Dench	My Week with Marilyn	Sybil Thorndike	
**2011** (65th)	Melissa McCarthy	Bridesmaids	Megan Price	
**2011** (65th)	Carey Mulligan	Drive	Irene	
**2012** (66th)	**Anne Hathaway** †	**Les Misérables**	**Fantine**	
**2012** (66th)	Amy Adams	The Master	Peggy Dodd	
**2012** (66th)	Judi Dench	Skyfall	M	
**2012** (66th)	Sally Field	Lincoln	Mary Todd Lincoln	
**2012** (66th)	Helen Hunt	The Sessions	Cheryl Cohen-Greene	
**2013** (67th)	**Jennifer Lawrence**	**American Hustle**	**Rosalyn Rosenfeld**	
**2013** (67th)	Sally Hawkins	Blue Jasmine	Ginger	
**2013** (67th)	Lupita Nyong'o †	12 Years a Slave	Patsey	
**2013** (67th)	Julia Roberts	August: Osage County	Barbara Weston-Fordham	
**2013** (67th)	Oprah Winfrey	The Butler	Gloria Gaines	
**2014** (68th)	**Patricia Arquette** †	**Boyhood**	**Olivia Evans**	
**2014** (68th)	Keira Knightley	The Imitation Game	Joan Clarke	
**2014** (68th)	Rene Russo	Nightcrawler	Nina Romina	
**2014** (68th)	Imelda Staunton	Pride	Hefina Headon	
**2014** (68th)	Emma Stone	Birdman	Sam Thomson	
**2015** (69th)	**Kate Winslet**	**Steve Jobs**	**Joanna Hoffman**	
**2015** (69th)	Jennifer Jason Leigh	The Hateful Eight	Daisy Domergue	
**2015** (69th)	Rooney Mara	Carol	Therese Belivet	
**2015** (69th)	Alicia Vikander	Ex Machina	Ava	
**2015** (69th)	Julie Walters	Brooklyn	Madge Kehoe	
**2016** (70th)	**Viola Davis** †	**Fences**	**Rose Maxson**	
**2016** (70th)	Naomie Harris	Moonlight	Paula Harris	
**2016** (70th)	Nicole Kidman	Lion	Sue Brierley	
**2016** (70th)	Hayley Squires	I, Daniel Blake	Katie Morgan	
**2016** (70th)	Michelle Williams	Manchester by the Sea	Randi Chandler	
**2017** (71st)	**Allison Janney** †	**I, Tonya**	**LaVona Golden**	
**2017** (71st)	Lesley Manville	Phantom Thread	Cyril Woodcock	
**2017** (71st)	Laurie Metcalf	Lady Bird	Marion McPherson	
**2017** (71st)	Kristin Scott Thomas	Darkest Hour	Clementine Churchill	
**2017** (71st)	Octavia Spencer	The Shape of Water	Zelda Fuller	
**2018** (72nd)	**Rachel Weisz**	**The Favourite**	**Lady Sarah**	
**2018** (72nd)	Amy Adams	Vice	Lynne Cheney	
**2018** (72nd)	Claire Foy	First Man	Janet Shearon Armstrong	
**2018** (72nd)	Margot Robbie	Mary Queen of Scots	Queen Elizabeth I	
**2018** (72nd)	Emma Stone	The Favourite	Abigail	
**2019** (73rd)	**Laura Dern** †	**Marriage Story**	**Nora Fanshaw**	
**2019** (73rd)	Scarlett Johansson	Jojo Rabbit	Rosie Betzler	
**2019** (73rd)	Florence Pugh	Little Women	Amy March	
**2019** (73rd)	Margot Robbie	Bombshell	Kayla Pospisil	
**2019** (73rd)	Margot Robbie	Once Upon a Time in Hollywood	Sharon Tate	

=== 2020s ===
Year	Actor	Role(s)	Film	Ref.
**2020** (74th)	**Youn Yuh-jung** †	**Minari**	**Soon-ja**	
**2020** (74th)	Niamh Algar	Calm with Horses	Ursula	
**2020** (74th)	Kosar Ali	Rocks	Sumaya	
**2020** (74th)	Maria Bakalova	Borat Subsequent Moviefilm	Tutar Sagdiyev	
**2020** (74th)	Dominique Fishback	Judas and the Black Messiah	Deborah Johnson	
**2020** (74th)	Ashley Madekwe	County Lines	Toni	
**2021** (75th)	**Ariana DeBose** †	**West Side Story**	**Anita**	
**2021** (75th)	Caitríona Balfe	Belfast	Ma	
**2021** (75th)	Jessie Buckley	The Lost Daughter	Young Leda Caruso	
**2021** (75th)	Ann Dowd	Mass	Linda	
**2021** (75th)	Aunjanue Ellis-Taylor	King Richard	Oracene Price	
**2021** (75th)	Ruth Negga	Passing	Clare Bellew	
**2022** (76th)	**Kerry Condon**	**The Banshees of Inisherin**	**Siobhán Súilleabháin**	
**2022** (76th)	Angela Bassett	Black Panther: Wakanda Forever	Queen Ramonda	
**2022** (76th)	Hong Chau	The Whale	Liz	
**2022** (76th)	Jamie Lee Curtis †	Everything Everywhere All at Once	Deirdre Beaubeirdre	
**2022** (76th)	Dolly de Leon	Triangle of Sadness	Abigail	
**2022** (76th)	Carey Mulligan	She Said	Megan Twohey	
**2023** (77th)	**Da'Vine Joy Randolph** †	**The Holdovers**	**Mary Lamb**	
**2023** (77th)	Emily Blunt	Oppenheimer	Katherine Oppenheimer	
**2023** (77th)	Danielle Brooks	The Color Purple	Sofia	
**2023** (77th)	Claire Foy	All of Us Strangers	Mum	
**2023** (77th)	Sandra Huller	The Zone of Interest	Hedwig Höss	
**2023** (77th)	Rosamund Pike	Saltburn	Lady Elspeth Catton	
**2024** (78th)	**Zoe Saldaña** †	**Emilia Pérez**	**Rita Mora Castro**	
**2024** (78th)	Jamie Lee Curtis	The Last Showgirl	Annette	
**2024** (78th)	Selena Gomez	Emilia Pérez	Jessi Del Monte	
**2024** (78th)	Ariana Grande	Wicked	Galinda "Glinda" Upland	
**2024** (78th)	Felicity Jones	The Brutalist	Erzsébet Tóth	
**2024** (78th)	Isabella Rossellini	Conclave	Sister Agnes	
**2025** (79th)	**Wunmi Mosaku**	**Sinners**	**Annie**	
**2025** (79th)	Odessa A'zion	Marty Supreme	Rachel Mizler	
**2025** (79th)	Inga Ibsdotter Lilleaas	Sentimental Value	Agnes Borg Pettersen	
**2025** (79th)	Carey Mulligan	The Ballad of Wallis Island	Nell Mortimer	
**2025** (79th)	Teyana Taylor	One Battle After Another	Perfidia Beverly Hills	
**2025** (79th)	Emily Watson	Hamnet	Mary Shakespeare	

== Superlatives ==
Superlative	Best Actress in a Supporting Role		Best Lead Actress		Overall (including Most Promising Newcomer)	
Actress with most awards	Judi Dench	3	Maggie Smith	4	Judi Dench	6
Actress with most nominations	Judi Dench	9	Meryl Streep	12	Judi Dench; Meryl Streep	15

== Multiple nominations ==
9 nominations

- Judi Dench

4 nominations

- Amy Adams
- Maggie Smith

3 nominations

- Cate Blanchett
- Jamie Lee Curtis
- Anjelica Huston
- Carey Mulligan
- Miranda Richardson
- Margot Robbie
- Kristin Scott Thomas
- Meryl Streep
- Julie Walters
- Billie Whitelaw
- Kate Winslet

2 nominations

- Rosanna Arquette
- Peggy Ashcroft
- Kathy Bates
- Brenda Blethyn
- Emily Blunt
- Helena Bonham Carter
- Toni Collette
- Sally Field
- Claire Foy
- Barbara Hershey
- Holly Hunter
- Rosemary Leach
- Lesley Manville
- Frances McDormand
- Lynn Redgrave
- Octavia Spencer
- Maureen Stapleton
- Imelda Staunton
- Emma Stone
- Tilda Swinton
- Sigourney Weaver
- Michelle Williams
- Shelley Winters

== Multiple wins ==
3 wins

- Judi Dench

2 wins

- Kate Winslet

== See also ==
- Academy Award for Best Supporting Actress
- Actor Award for Outstanding Performance by a Female Actor in a Supporting Role
- Critics' Choice Movie Award for Best Supporting Actress
- Golden Globe Award for Best Supporting Actress – Motion Picture
- Independent Spirit Award for Best Supporting Performance
- Lists of acting awards
- List of awards for supporting actor

== Notes ==
A^{1} ^{2} : Rules from the 1960s to the 1970s allowed for a performer to receive a single citation which could honor their work in more than one film. Billie Whitelaw and Jodie Foster were both nominated for their roles in two different films in the same category.
B^{1} ^{2} : Rohini Hattangadi and Maureen Stapleton received the same number of votes, resulting in both actresses receiving the award, according to Academy rules.
