= Time Out for Peggy =

British TV sitcom (1958–1959)

Time Out for Peggy is a British television series which aired from 1958 to 1959. A sitcom set in a boarding house, the series starred Billie Whitelaw. It was produced by ABC Weekend TV and aired on ITV. None of the episodes are known to exist.
