= Billie Whitelaw =

British actress (1932–2014)

Billie Whitelaw CBE
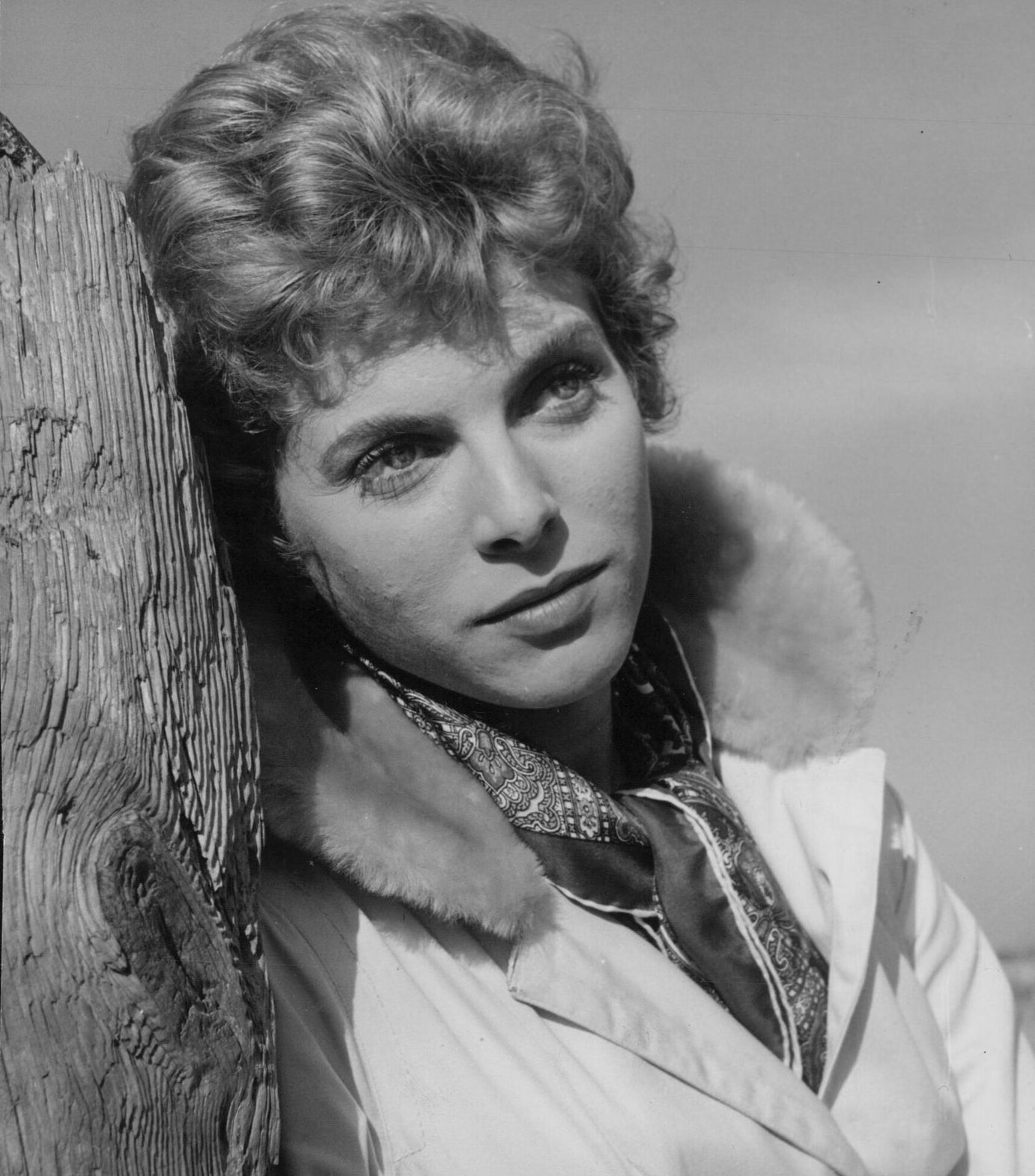
- Whitelaw in the 1970s
- Born: Billie Honor Whitelaw; 6 June 1932; Coventry, Warwickshire, (Note: Since 1 April 1974, Coventry has been part of West Midlands.) England
- Died: 21 December 2014 (aged 82); Northwood, London, England
- Occupation: Actress
- Years active: 1950–2007
- Known for: The Omen; Charlie Bubbles
- Spouses: Peter Vaughan (m. 1952; div. 1966) Robert Muller (m. 1983; died 1998)
- Children: 3
- Awards: BAFTA Award for Best Actress in a Supporting Role

Billie Honor Whitelaw (6 June 1932 – 21 December 2014) was an English actress. She worked in close collaboration with the Irish playwright Samuel Beckett for 25 years and was regarded as one of the foremost interpreters of his works. She was also known for her portrayal of Mrs Baylock, the demonic nanny in the 1976 horror film The Omen.

Whitelaw was nominated for three Television BAFTAs, winning two, in 1961 and 1973. She was also nominated for four Film BAFTAs, winning the Award for Best Actress in a Supporting Role for both Charlie Bubbles and Twisted Nerve in 1969.

== Early life ==
Billie Honor Whitelaw was born on 6 June 1932 in Coventry, Warwickshire, the daughter of Frances Mary (née Williams) and Gerry Whitelaw. She had one sister, Constance, who was 10 years older. Whitelaw grew up in a working-class part of Bradford and went to Thornton Grammar School, later attending Grange Girls' Grammar School, both in Bradford.

At age 11, she began performing as a child actress on radio programmes, including the part of Bunkle, an extrovert prep-schoolboy on Children's Hour from Manchester, and later worked as an assistant stage manager and acted with the repertory company at the Prince's Theatre in Bradford while still at school. Her father died of lung cancer when Billie was 9 years old. Money was tight and her mother struggled to support the family. "It's something I haven't come to terms with ... I'm rather ashamed of having the good life I have", she later recalled.

At age 16, Whitelaw met the director Joan Littlewood at the BBC in Manchester and was invited to join her Theatre Workshop troupe. She was encouraged by her mother to join Harry Hanson's Leeds company in 1948 and then went on to play in repertory theatres in Dewsbury, New Brighton and Oxford, eventually making her London debut in 1950.

== Career ==
=== Film career ===
Whitelaw made her film debut in The Sleeping Tiger (1954), followed by roles in Carve Her Name with Pride (1958), and Hell Is a City (1960). Whitelaw soon became a regular in British films of the 1950s and early 1960s. In her early film work, she specialised in blousy blondes and secretaries, but her dramatic range began to emerge by the late 1960s. She starred with Albert Finney in Charlie Bubbles (1967), for which she won a BAFTA award as Best Actress in a Supporting Role. She won her second BAFTA as the sensuous mother of college student Hayley Mills in the psychological study Twisted Nerve (1969). She continued in film roles including Leo the Last (1970), Start the Revolution Without Me (1970), Gumshoe (1971), and the Alfred Hitchcock thriller Frenzy (1972).

Whitelaw gained international acclaim for her chilling role as Mrs Baylock, the evil guardian of the demon child Damien in The Omen (1976). Her performance was considered one of the more memorable of the film, winning her the Evening Standard British Film Award for Best Actress. Other films included performing the voice of Aughra in The Dark Crystal, as the hopelessly naive Mrs Hall in Maurice (1987), one of two sisters, with Joan Plowright, struggling to survive in war-time Liverpool in The Dressmaker (1988), the fiercely domineering and protective mother of psychopathic twin murderers in The Krays (1990), a performance that earned her a BAFTA nomination, as the nurse, Grace Poole, in Jane Eyre (1996), and the blind laundress in Quills (2000). She returned to film, in a comedy turn, as Joyce Cooper in Hot Fuzz (2007).

In 1970, she was a member of the jury at the 20th Berlin International Film Festival.

=== Theatre career and collaboration with Samuel Beckett ===
In 1963, Billie Whitelaw met Irish playwright Samuel Beckett. She and Beckett enjoyed an intense professional relationship until his death in 1989. He wrote many of his more experimental plays especially for her, referring to Whitelaw as "a perfect actress". Whitelaw became Beckett's muse, as he created, reworked and revised each play while she physically, at times to the point of total exhaustion, acted each movement.

Whitelaw remained the foremost interpreter of the man and his work. She gave lectures on the Beckettian technique and explained: "He used me as a piece of plaster he was moulding until he got just the right shape." They collaborated on Beckett plays such as Play, Eh Joe, Happy Days, Not I, Footfalls and Rockaby for both stage and screen. For her performance in Rockaby, Whitelaw was nominated for a Drama Desk Award.

From 1964 to 1966, she was a member of Britain's National Theatre Company. In 1965, she took over the part of Desdemona opposite Laurence Olivier's Othello from Maggie Smith.

=== Television career ===
Whitelaw also appeared frequently on television and won acclaim for her work. A very early TV appearance was in the first series of the long-running BBC police series Dixon of Dock Green (1955), as Mary Dixon, daughter of George (Jack Warner). She also appeared as a woman who tries to join Robin Hood's outlaw band in a 1957 episode of The Adventures of Robin Hood, "The Bride of Robin Hood" and won a BAFTA award as Best Actress for her performance in The Sextet (1972). She starred in the 1958–59 sitcom Time Out for Peggy. She also appeared in an episode of Wicked Women (1970), the BBC adaptation of Thomas Hardy's Wessex Tales (1973), A Tale of Two Cities (1980), Private Schulz (1982), A Murder of Quality (1991), Duel of Hearts (1991), Firm Friends (1992–94) with Madhur Jaffrey, Born to Run (1997), Merlin (1998), and A Dinner of Herbs (2000). In 1996, she featured in the music video for Never Never Love by Simply Red.

== Personal life and death ==
Whitelaw was married to the actor Peter Vaughan from 1952 to 1966. She later married the writer and drama critic Robert Muller. The couple had one son together, born in 1968. Muller died in 1998.

Having divided her time between a home in Hampstead, north London, and a cottage near Glemsford in Suffolk, Whitelaw spent the last four years of her life as a resident of Denville Hall, the actors' retirement and nursing home in Northwood, Hillingdon. She died there aged 82, following a bout of pneumonia, on 21 December 2014.

Billie Whitelaw...Who He? An Autobiography, was published by St Martin's Press in 1995.

== Accolades and honours ==
Whitelaw was appointed a Commander of the Order of the British Empire (CBE) by Queen Elizabeth II in the 1991 Birthday Honours.

=== Awards and nominations ===
Year	Awards	Category	Nominated work	Result	Ref.
1961	British Academy Film Awards	Most Promising Newcomer to Leading Film Roles	Hell Is a City	Nominated	
1961	British Academy Television Awards	Best Actress	—N/a (Note: The 1961 BAFTA for Best TV Actress honoured all of a performer's work for that year; no specific role was credited.)	Won	
1969	British Academy Film Awards	Best Actress in a Supporting Role	Charlie Bubbles / Twisted Nerve	Won	
1973	British Academy Television Awards	Best Actress	The Sextet (8 Plays)	Won	
1974	British Academy Television Awards	Best Actress	Wessex Tales: The Withered Arm	Nominated	
1977	British Academy Film Awards	Best Actress in a Supporting Role	The Omen	Nominated	
1977	Evening Standard British Film Awards	Best Actress	The Omen	Won	
1979	Laurence Olivier Awards	Actress of the Year in a Revival	Happy Days	Nominated	
1988	Evening Standard British Film Awards	Best Actress	The Dressmaker	Won	
1991	British Academy Film Awards	Best Actress in a Supporting Role	The Krays	Nominated	

== Selected filmography ==
- The Fake (1953) as Waitress
- The Sleeping Tiger (1954) as Receptionist at Pearce & Mann
- Companions in Crime (1955)
- Room in the House (1955)
- Mr. Arkadin (1955) (voice)
- Miracle in Soho (1957) as Maggie
- Small Hotel (1957) as Caroline Mallet
- Carve Her Name with Pride (1958) as Winnie
- Gideon's Day (1958) as Christine (uncredited)
- Television Playwright (1958, TV series) as Betty Coogan (1 episode)
- Time Out for Peggy (1958–1959, TV series) as Peggy Spencer
- Breakout (1959) as Rose Munro
- Bobbikins (1959) as Lydia Simmons
- The Flesh and the Fiends (1960) as Mary Patterson
- Hell Is a City (1960) as Chloe Hawkins
- Make Mine Mink (1960) as Lily
- Payroll (1961) as Jackie Parker
- No Love for Johnnie (1961) as Mary
- Mr. Topaze (1961) as Ernestine
- The Devil's Agent (1962) as Piroska Maslov
- The Comedy Man (1964) as Judy
- Charlie Bubbles (1967) as Lottie Bubbles
- The Strange Case of Dr Jekyll and Mr. Hyde (1968, TV Movie) as Gwyn Thomas
- Twisted Nerve (1968) as Joan Harper
- The Adding Machine (1969) as Daisy Devore
- Start the Revolution Without Me (1970) as Queen Marie Antoinette
- Leo the Last (1970) as Margaret
- Gumshoe (1971) as Ellen
- Eagle in a Cage (1972) as Madame Bertrand
- Frenzy (1972) as Hetty Porter
- Follow the Yellow Brick Road (1972, TV series) as Judy Black
- Night Watch (1973) as Sarah Cooke
- Napoleon and Love (1974, TV Mini-Series) as Josephine
- The Omen (1976) as Mrs. Baylock
- Space: 1999 (1976, TV Series ) as Zamara
- The Water Babies (1978) as Mrs. Doasyouwouldbedoneby / Old Crone / Mrs Tripp / Woman in Black / Water Babies 'Gate Keeper'
- Leopard in the Snow (1978) as Isabel James
- A Tale of Two Cities (1980) as Madame Therese Defarge
- Private Schulz (1980) as Bertha Freyer
- An Unsuitable Job for a Woman (1982) as Elizabeth Leaming
- The Dark Crystal (1982) as Aughra (voice)
- Jamaica Inn (1983, TV Series) as Aunt Patience
- Terror in the Aisles (1984) as Madge
- The Chain (1984) as Mrs. Andreos
- Camille (1984, TV Movie) as Prudence Duvorney
- Tangiers (1985) as Louise
- Shadey (1985) as Doctor Cloud
- Murder Elite (1985) as Margaret Baker
- Maurice (1987) as Mrs. Hall
- The Secret Garden (1987) as Mrs. Medlock
- Joyriders (1988) as Tammy O'Moore
- The Dressmaker (1988) as Margo
- The Krays (1990) as Violet Kray
- Freddie as F.R.O.7 (1992) as Messina (voice)
- Deadly Advice (1994) as Kate Webster
- Jane Eyre (1996) as Grace Poole
- Merlin (1998, TV Mini-Series) as Ambrosia
- The Lost Son (1999) as Mrs. Spitz
- The Last of the Blonde Bombshells (2000) as Evelyn
- Quills (2000) as Madame LeClerc
- Hot Fuzz (2007) as Joyce Cooper (final film role)

Music Video appearances
Year	Title	Artist	Ref
1996	Never Never Love	Simply Red	
