= Charlie Bubbles =

1967 British film by Albert Finney

- Film Poster
- Directed by: Albert Finney
- Written by: Shelagh Delaney
- Produced by: Michael Medwin
- Starring: Albert Finney; Billie Whitelaw; Liza Minnelli; Colin Blakely
- Cinematography: Peter Suschitzky
- Edited by: Fergus McDonell
- Music by: Misha Donat
- Production companies: Universal Pictures; Memorial Enterprises
- Distributed by: Rank Film Distributors
- Release dates: 11 February 1968 (US); 19 September 1968 (UK)
- Running time: 89 minutes
- Country: United Kingdom
- Language: English
- Budget: $1 million or £318,483

Charlie Bubbles is a 1968 British comedy-drama film directed by Albert Finney (in his feature directorial debut) and starring Finney, Billie Whitelaw, Colin Blakely and Liza Minnelli. The screenplay was by Shelagh Delaney.

The plot concerns a writer returning to his home city after achieving success in London. Director Stephen Frears worked as an assistant director to Finney on this film.

== Plot ==
Successful writer Charlie Bubbles glides around in a gold Rolls-Royce Silver Cloud III convertible – CB 1E. Reminded by a phone call from his ex-wife Lottie that he has promised to take their son Jack to a football match, Bubbles sets off from London with his secretary Eliza to drive to Manchester. The next day he drives to Lottie's farm, and it becomes obvious that visits are few and far between.

Father and son go to a football match and eat hotdogs from their private box at Old Trafford. An old school friend turned newspaper reporter enters the box and they chat awkwardly for a few moments. The film then sharply cuts to scenes outside the stadium where Bubbles is desperately looking for Jack, who has gone missing. Bubbles returns in panic to the farm without the boy, driving the Rolls erratically and stopping to vomit on the way, only to find Jack has made his own way home. Next morning Bubbles awakes to find a large red balloon moored near the farm. He climbs into the basket and drifts away.

== Cast ==
- Albert Finney as Charlie Bubbles
- Colin Blakely as Smokey Pickles
- Billie Whitelaw as Lottie Bubbles
- Liza Minnelli as Eliza
- Timothy Garland as Jack Bubbles
- Richard Pearson as accountant
- Nicholas Phipps as agent
- Peter Sallis as solicitor
- Charles Lamb as Mr. Noseworthy
- Margery Mason as Mrs. Noseworthy
- Diana Coupland as Maud
- George Innes as garage attendant
- Arthur Pentelow as man with car
- Alan Lake as airman
- Yootha Joyce as woman in café
- Wendy Padbury as woman in café
- Susan Engel as nanny

== Release ==
It was screened at the 1968 Cannes Film Festival on the 11th, just before the festival was called off due to the events of May 1968 in France.

=== Critical response ===
Although the film received critical acclaim, it was not a commercial success in Britain. Finney blamed this on what he regarded as a mishandled and much-delayed release by Rank Film Distributors.

The Monthly Film Bulletin wrote: "Everything is in a continuous present, without perspective; and despite the actual journey, the film is more a journey of inner discovery, the motorway a mysterious tunnel, the locations like vivid dream pictures. In this setting, the film explores a series of relationships – some casual, some transient, one deep. And as in a comparable study of a circle of relationships, Le Feu Follet, each character just eludes the central figure. But Charlie Bubbles avoids diagnosis; and its integrity is clearest in the treatment of the relationship between Charlie and Lottie. Here everything possible has long been said, yet the brief, flat exchanges emerge charged with recollection and irony ... Despite occasional lapses with enigma and stylisation for its own sake, as in the motorway café sequence, Albert Finney has made a promising debut as a director."

In The New York Times review, critic Renata Adler praised the film, which she called "a becalmed Blow-Up" and "a completely honest and original thing." She also added: "The ending, a low key absurdist touch, is as quiet, beautifully made and carefully thought out as the rest."

Leslie Halliwell said: "A little arid and slow in the early stages, and with a rather lame end ... this is nevertheless a fascinating character study with a host of wry comedy touches and nimbly sketched characters; in its unassuming way it indicts many of the symbols people lived by in the sixties."

The Radio Times Guide to Films gave the film 3/5 stars, writing: "Rich in resonances of the era."

Alexander Walker wrote: "The trouble with Charlie Bubbles is that the character is an extremely passive type. All the other people in the film are seen or felt by him."

== Home media ==
The film was released on DVD in September 2008, and on Blu-ray in November 2018.

== Accolades ==
Whitelaw won a 1969 BAFTA for Best Supporting Actress for her roles in Charlie Bubbles and Twisted Nerve.
