= Talking Statues =

2013 project by documentary filmmaker David Peter Fox

Talking Statues is a project that was created in 2013 by documentary filmmaker David Peter Fox, who is based in Copenhagen, Denmark. Inspired by the book, Sculptures in Copenhagen by Jens Peters Munk, Fox went on to provide a history and backstory for the figures represented by the statues. The project consists of prerecorded voice-overs that are matched to various statues found in public areas using QR codes. The first talking statue was the statue of Hans Christian Andersen in the King's Garden in Copenhagen and, later, talking statues were created for public areas in cities such as Helsinki, New York, London, San Diego, Chicago, Vilnius, Parma, Dublin, Berlin, and Manchester.

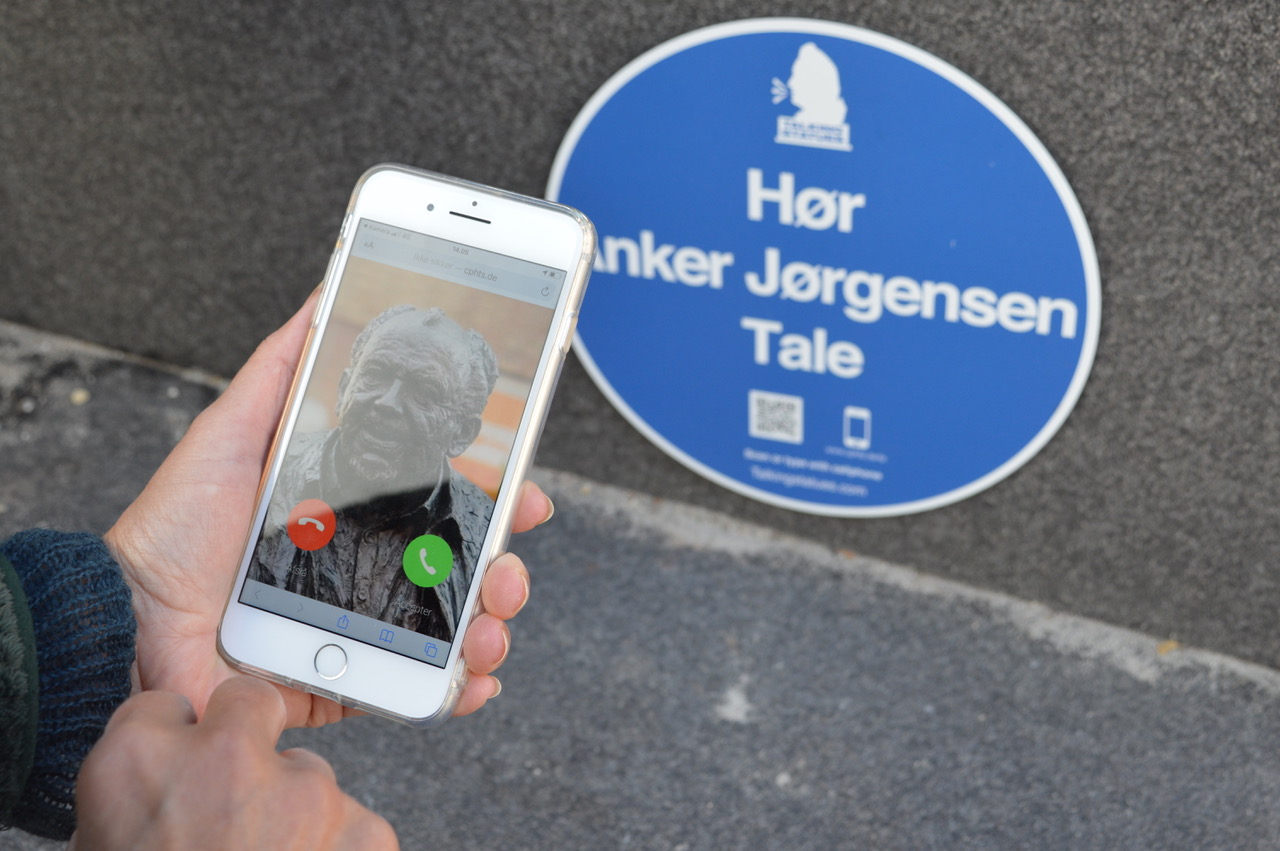
Scanning the QR code at a statue

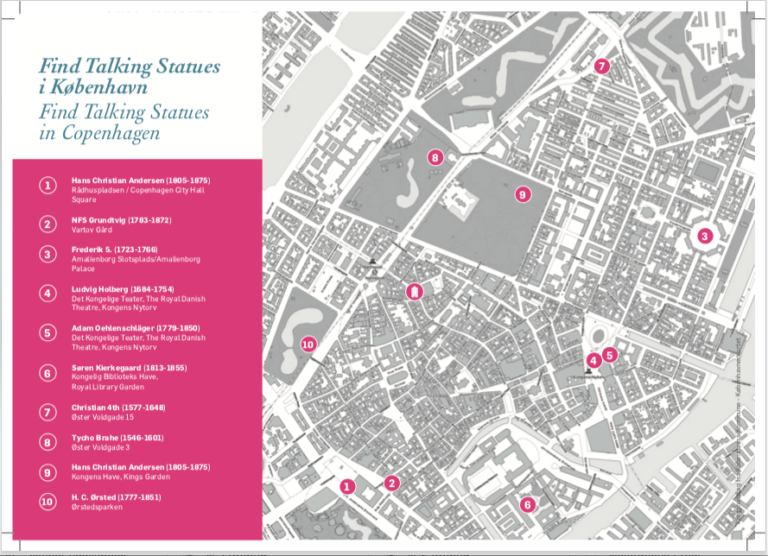
Map of Talking Statues Copenhagen

The City of Copenhagen funded the initial project, and the monologues were written by film director Carsten Rudolf in collaboration with David Peter Fox. Actor Jens Jacob Tychsen spoke the monologues.

== List of statues ==
=== Copenhagen link to website ===
Image	Statue	Location	Author	Actor(s)
	Hans Christian Andersen	King's Garden	Carsten Rudolf / David Peter Fox	Jens Jacob Tychsen
	N. F. S. Grundtvig	Vartov Yard	Carsten Rudolf / David Peter Fox	Jens Jacob Tychsen
	Søren Kierkegaard	Royal Library Garden	Carsten Rudolf / David Peter Fox	Jens Jacob Tychsen
	Ludvig Holberg	The Royal Theater, Copenhagen	Carsten Rudolf / David Peter Fox	Jens Jacob Tychsen
	Adam Oehlenschläger	The Royal Theater, Copenhagen	Carsten Rudolf / David Peter Fox	Jens Jacob Tychsen
	Frederik V	Amalienborg Palace Square	Carsten Rudolf / David Peter Fox	Jens Jacob Tychsen
	Christian IV	Øster Voldgade, Copenhagen	Carsten Rudolf / David Peter Fox	Jens Jacob Tychsen
	Tycho Brahe	Copenhagen Observatorium	Carsten Rudolf / David Peter Fox	Jens Jacob Tychsen
	Hans Christian Andersen	City Town Hall, Copenhagen	Carsten Rudolf / David Peter Fox	Jens Jacob Tychsen
	Hans Christian Ørsted	Ørstedsparken, Copenhagen	Carsten Rudolf / David Peter Fox	Jens Jacob Tychsen

=== London link to website ===
Image	Statue	Location	Author	Actor(s)
	Peter Pan	Kensington Gardens	Ella Hickson	Daniel Roche
	Queen Victoria	Blackfriars Bridge	Elizabeth Day	Prunella Scales
	Dick Whittington’s Cat	Highgate Hill	Helen Lederer	Helen Lederer
	Hugh Myddleton	Islington Green	Tom Basden	Jonny Sweet
	The Goat	Spitalfields Market	Hugh Dennis	Hugh Dennis
	Eye I	Bishopsgate	Sara Pascoe	Sara Pascoe
	John Wilkes	Fetter Lane, Holborn	Jeremy Paxman	Jeremy Paxman
	Rowland Hill	City of London	Colette Hiller	Alan Johnson, MP
	Hodge the Cat	Gough Square, Holborn	Catherine Hiller	Nicholas Parsons
	Isaac Newton	British Library	Timberlake Wertenbaker	Simon Russell Beale
	Sherlock Holmes	Baker Street station	Anthony Horowitz	Ed Stoppard
	"The Plumber's Apprentice	Paddington station	Rachel Wagstaff	Hugh Bonneville
	George Orwell"	BBC Broadcasting House	Robert Seatter	Mathew Horne
	Queen Victoria	Kensington Palace	Katrina Burnett	Patricia Hodge

=== Manchester link to website ===
Image	Statue	Location	Author	Actor(s)
	Abraham Lincoln	Brazenoze Square	Gary Younge	Tom Conti
	Reading Girl	Manchester Central Library	Jacqueline Wilson	Jenna Coleman
	Alan Turing	Fairfield Street	Mark Ravenhill	Russell Tovey
	LS Lowry	Sam's Chophouse	Kiran Benawara	David Neilson
	John Barbirolli	Bridgewater Hall	Michael Kennedy	Timothy West
	Queen Victoria	Piccadilly Gardens	Katrina Burnett	Prunella Scales

=== New York link to website ===
Image	Statue	Location	Author	Actor(s)
	Harriet Tubman	Christopher Park	Eric Marcus	Harrison Ghee, Claybourne Elder, Rosa Gilmore, Conrad Ricamora, and Tony nominee Jenn Colella
	Robert Burns	Central Park	Wendy MacLeod	Andrew Barret
	Harriet Tubman	Harlem	Terry McMillan	Patti Richards
	William Shakespeare	Central Park	Marc Acito	Michael Perrie Jr
	Lincoln	New-York Historical Society		Pete Simpson
	Frederick Douglass	New York-Historical Society	Terry McMillan	Robert Lacy Jr
	George Washington	Federal Hall	Wendy MacLeod	Bart Shatto
	Ludwig van Beethoven	Central Park	Wendy MacLeod	Bruce Kramer
	George Washington	Brooklyn	Wendy MacLeod	Bart Shatto
	Hans Christian Andersen	Central Park	Kim Fupz Aakeson	Mads Mikkelsen
	John Ericsson	Battery Park	Marc Acito	David Dencik
	Gertrude Stein	Bryant Park	Marc Acito	Stacey Lightman
	Antonín Dvořák	Stuyvesant Square Park	Marc Acito	Jan Triska
	Giovanni da Verrazzano	Battery Park	Joe Giordano	Roberto Ragone
	Abraham Lincoln	Union Square		Pete Simpson
	Gandhi	Union Square	Thrity Umrigar	
	Peter Stuyvesant	Stuyvesant Square	Christine Otten	Michael Wouters
	George Washington	Union Square	Wendy MacLeod	Bart Shatto
	Confucius	Confucius Plaza	Jean Kwok	Geoff Lee
	Balto	Central Park	Wendy MacLeod	Jakob Oftebro

=== Ithaca ===
Image	Statue	Location	Author	Actor(s)
	Lucy J. Brown	Henry St. John Building	Lucy J. Brown	Lucy J. Brown

=== Dublin link to website ===
Image	Statue	Location	Author	Actor(s)
	James Joyce	Earl Street North	Roddy Doyle	Gabriel Byrne
	James Connolly	Beresford Place	Brendan O'Carroll	Brendan O'Carroll
	James Larkin	O'Connell Street	Enda Walsh	Stephen Rea
	O'Connell Monument	O'Connell Street	Paula Meehan	Ruth Negga
	Wolfe Tone	St Stephen's Green	Patrick McCabe	Brendan Gleeson
	Oscar Wilde	Merrion Square North	John Banville	Andrew Scott
	Meeting Place	Liffey Street Lower	Rachel Kilfeather	Brenda Fricker
	George Bernard Shaw	Merrion Square West	Arthur Mathews	Stephen Brennan
	Molly Malone	Suffolk Street	Michaela Mcmahon	Maria Doyle Kennedy
	George Salmon	Trinity College Dublin, College Green	Joe Duffy	Joe Duffy

=== Rome link to website ===
Image	Statue	Location	Author	Actor(s)
	Fontana del Tritone	Rome	David Peter Fox	Gabriel Byrne
	Bocca della Verità	Rome	David Peter Fox	Brendan O'Carroll
	Statue of Julius Caesar	Rome	David Peter Fox	Stephen Rea
	Ecstasy of Saint Teresa	Rome	David Peter Fox	Ruth Negga
	Michelangelo's Moses	Rome	David Peter Fox	Brendan Gleeson
	Statue of Marcus Aurelius	Rome	David Peter Fox	Andrew Scott
	Il Babuino	Rome	David Peter Fox	Brendan Gleeson
	Augustus of Prima Porta	Rome	David Peter Fox	Brendan Gleeson
	Madama Lucrezia	Rome	David Peter Fox	Andrew Scott
	Il Facchino	Rome	David Peter Fox	Andrew Scott
	Pasquino	Rome	David Peter Fox	Andrew Scott
	Capitoline She-wolf	Rome	David Peter Fox	Brenda Fricker
	Abate Luigi	Rome	David Peter Fox	Stephen Brennan
	Marforio	Rome	David Peter Fox	Maria Doyle Kennedy
	Laocoön and His Sons	Rome	David Peter Fox	Joe Duffy

=== Paris link to website ===
Image	Statue	Location	Author	Actor(s)
	Saint Denis statue	Paris	David Peter Fox	Gabriel Byrne
	Le Passe-Muraille	Paris	David Peter Fox	Brendan O'Carroll
	Statua di Giulio Cesare	Paris	David Peter Fox	Stephen Rea
	Ecstasy of Saint Teresa	Paris	David Peter Fox	Ruth Negga
	Statue du Général Charles de Gaulle	Paris	David Peter Fox	Brendan Gleeson
	Statue of George Washington	Paris	David Peter Fox	Andrew Scott
	Flamme de la Liberté	Paris	David Peter Fox	Brendan Gleeson
	Augustus of Prima Porta	Paris	David Peter Fox	Brendan Gleeson
	Statue de Jeanne d'Arc	Paris	David Peter Fox	Andrew Scott
	Obélisque de Louxor	Paris	David Peter Fox	Andrew Scott
	Buste de Dalida	Paris	David Peter Fox	Andrew Scott

=== Berlin link to website ===
Image	Statue	Location	Author	Actor(s)
	kathe-kollwitz	Berlin	David Peter Fox	Gabriel Byrne
	Marx-Engels	Berlin	David Peter Fox	Brendan O'Carroll
	Moltke-Denkmal	Berlin	David Peter Fox	Stephen Rea
	Luther-Denkmal	Berlin	David Peter Fox	Ruth Negga
	Heinrich Zille	Berlin	David Peter Fox	Brendan Gleeson
	Der Rufer	Berlin	David Peter Fox	Andrew Scott
	Lise Meitner Denkmal	Berlin	David Peter Fox	Brendan Gleeson
	Bertolf Brecht	Berlin	David Peter Fox	Brendan Gleeson
	Hauptmann von Köpenick	Berlin	David Peter Fox	Andrew Scott
	The Lion Fighter	Berlin	David Peter Fox	Andrew Scott

=== Amsterdam link to website ===
Image	Statue	Location	Author	Actor(s)
	Statue “Amsterdams Lieverdje”	Amsterdam	Roddy Doyle	Gabriel Byrne
	Borstplaat	Amsterdam	Brendan O'Carroll	Brendan O'Carroll
	Statue “Belle”	Amsterdam	Enda Walsh	Stephen Rea
	Boomzagertje	Amsterdam	Paula Meehan	Ruth Negga
	Statue Vrouw met Stola	Amsterdam	Patrick McCabe	Brendan Gleeson
	Rembrandt Monument	Amsterdam	John Banville	Andrew Scott
	Multatuli statue	Amsterdam	Rachel Kilfeather	Brenda Fricker
	Majoor Bosshardt Monument	Amsterdam	Arthur Mathews	Stephen Brennan
	Multatuli statue	Amsterdam	Rachel Kilfeather	Brenda Fricker
	Monument of Anne Frank	Amsterdam	Arthur Mathews	Stephen Brennan
	Sculpture De Violist	Amsterdam	Michaela Mcmahon	Maria Doyle Kennedy
	André Hazes statue	Amsterdam	Joe Duffy	Joe Duffy

=== Chicago link to website ===
Image	Statue	Location	Author	Actor(s)
	Hans Christian Andersen	Chicago	Eric Marcus	J. Harrison Ghee, Claybourne Elder, Rosa Gilmore, Conrad Ricamora, and Jenn Colella
	Robert Burns	Chicago	Wendy MacLeod	Andrew Barret
	Bust of Jean Baptiste Point du Sable	Chicago	Terry McMillan	Patti Richards
	The Picasso Sculpture	Chicago	Marc Acito	Michael Perrie Jr
	Man with Fish	Chicago		Pete Simpson
	Frederick Douglass	Chicago	Terry McMillan	Robert Lacy Jr
	Miro's Chicago	Chicago	Wendy MacLeod	Bart Shatto
	the Cowardly Lion	Chicago	Wendy MacLeod	Bruce Kramer
	Cloud Gate	Chicago	Wendy MacLeod	Bart Shatto
	Hans Christian Andersen	Chicago	Kim Fupz Aakeson	Mads Mikkelsen
	Benjamin Franklin Monument	Chicago	Marc Acito	David Dencik
	The Chicago Lincoln	Chicago	Marc Acito	Stacey Lightman

=== Arizona link to website ===
Image	Statue	Location	Author	Actor(s)
	Giganticus Headicus	Arizona	Roddy Doyle	Gabriel Byrne
	James Connolly	Arizona	Brendan O'Carroll	Brendan O'Carroll
	James Larkin	Arizona	Enda Walsh	Stephen Rea
	O'Connell Monument	Arizona	Paula Meehan	Ruth Negga
	Old Bill Williams statue	Arizona	Patrick McCabe	Brendan Gleeson
	Geronimo Surrender Monument	Arizona	John Banville	Andrew Scott
	Madonna of the Trail	Arizona	Rachel Kilfeather	Brenda Fricker
	George Bernard Shaw	Arizona	Arthur Mathews	Stephen Brennan
	Miner	Arizona	Michaela Mcmahon	Maria Doyle Kennedy

=== Detroit link to website ===
Image	Statue	Location	Author	Actor(s)
	The Spirit of Detroit	Detroit	Roddy Doyle	Gabriel Byrne
	James Scott statue and fountain	Detroit	Enda Walsh	Stephen Rea
	Thaddeus Kosciuszko Statue	Detroit	Paula Meehan	Ruth Negga
	Select The Michigan Soldiers’ and Sailors’ Monument	Detroit	Patrick McCabe	Brendan Gleeson
	Statue of Alexander Macomb	Detroit	John Banville	Andrew Scott
	Gateway to Freedom International Memorial to the Underground Railroad	Detroit	Rachel Kilfeather	Brenda Fricker
	The Fist. Monument to Joe Louis	Detroit	Arthur Mathews	Stephen Brennan
	Antoine de la Mothe Cadillac	Detroit	Michaela Mcmahon	Maria Doyle Kennedy

=== Miami link to website ===
Image	Statue	Location	Author	Actor(s)
	Ronald Reagan	Miami	Roddy Doyle	Gabriel Byrne
	James Scott statue and fountain	Miami	Enda Walsh	Stephen Rea
	Miami Bull	Miami	Paula Meehan	Ruth Negga
	Miami Beach Holocaust Memorial	Miami	Patrick McCabe	Brendan Gleeson
	Juan Ponce de León	Miami	John Banville	Andrew Scott
	Julia Tuttev	Miami	Rachel Kilfeather	Brenda Fricker
	The Tower Of Snow Statue	Miami	Arthur Mathews	Stephen Brennan
	Columbus	Miami	Michaela Mcmahon	Maria Doyle Kennedy

=== Ohklahoma link to website ===
Image	Statue	Location	Author	Actor(s)
	Centennial Land Run Monument	Oklahoma	Roddy Doyle	Gabriel Byrne
	Pioneer Woman	Oklahoma	Enda Walsh	Stephen Rea
	Golden Driller		Paula Meehan	Ruth Negga
	As Long as the Waters Flows	Oklahoma	Patrick McCabe	Brendan Gleeson
	And Jesus Wept	Oklahoma	John Banville	Andrew Scott
	The Guardian	Oklahoma	Rachel Kilfeather	Brenda Fricker
	The Tower Of Snow Statue	Oklahoma	Arthur Mathews	Stephen Brennan
	Columbus	Oklahoma	Michaela Mcmahon	Maria Doyle Kennedy

=== Philadelphia link to website ===
Image	Statue	Location	Author	Actor(s)
	Freedom Sculpture	Philadelphia	Roddy Doyle	Gabriel Byrne
	Thorfinn Karlsefni Statue	Philadelphia	Enda Walsh	Stephen Rea
	Lion fighter	Philadelphia	Paula Meehan	Ruth Negga
	Joe Frazier statue	Philadelphia	Patrick McCabe	Brendan Gleeson
	Rocky Statue	Philadelphia	John Banville	Andrew Scott
	Christopher Columbus	Philadelphia	Rachel Kilfeather	Brenda Fricker
	The Tower Of Snow Statue	Philadelphia	Arthur Mathews	Stephen Brennan
	Lincoln	Philadelphia	Michaela Mcmahon	Maria Doyle Kennedy
