= Come and Go =

1965 play by Samuel Beckett

- Original language: English
- Written by: Samuel Beckett
- Characters: Flo, Vi, Ru
- Setting: Non-specific

Premiere
- Date: 14 January 1966
- Place: Schiller-Theater Werkstatt, Berlin

Come and Go is a short play (described as a "dramaticule" on its title page) by Samuel Beckett. It was written in English in January 1965 and first performed (in German) at the Schillertheater, Berlin on 14 January 1966. Its English language premiere was at the Peacock Theatre, Dublin on 28 February 1968, and its British premiere was at the Royal Festival Hall in London on 9 December 1968. It was written for and dedicated to the publisher John Calder.

Some critics consider this one of Beckett's most "perfect" plays: Beckett agonized over each individual line until they exactly matched his creative vision. The play varies between "121 and 127 words" in length, depending on the translation (his notes are significantly longer than the actual play), and as such is rarely performed on its own.

== Synopsis ==
Successive positions
1	FLO	VI	RU
2	FLO		RU
		FLO	RU
3	VI	FLO	RU
4	VI		RU
	VI	RU	
5	VI	RU	FLO
6	VI		FLO
		VI	FLO
7	RU	VI	FLO

The play starts with three similar figures of "indeterminable" age, Flo, Vi, and Ru, sitting quietly on a narrow bench-like seat surrounded by darkness. They are childhood friends who once attended "Miss Wade's" together and sitting side by side in this manner is something they used to do in the playground back then. The three characters – unusually for Beckett – wear colourful full-length coats, albeit now dulled over time. They might give the impression of three faded flowers. "Drab nondescript hats … shade [their] faces."

When together they make uneasy, highly stylized/processed small talk in an encounter that takes on a haunting ritual aspect. After a short time Vi, who is seated in the centre, rises and silently goes off stage. Once she is out of earshot Flo asks Ru how she thinks their absent friend is looking. "I see little change," Ru replies. Then Flo slides over to the middle to whisper an awful revelation to the other and swears her to secrecy. After this Vi returns and takes the seat vacated by Flo. The same scenario is then enacted twice more "[w]ith choreography suggestive of the sleight-of-hand artist (button under the thimble)" and with very similar dialogue until Vi finds herself back in the middle of the group; Ru and Flo's positions have however been reversed.

In this manner all three women at one point occupy the central position and all become privy to a secret about one of the others. Beckett said the action should be: "Stiff, slow, puppet-like." The audience however does not get to hear what is whispered. The initial response in each instance is a shocked, "Oh," though Beckett specified that each should be unique in some way. These three whispers present moments of dramatic climax in contrast to the otherwise slow and calm mood. The most sensational whispered information is unheard by the audience and thus creates more mystery and a sense of ongoing interconnection between the trio which includes sharing "secrets."

At the play's conclusion, the three link hands "in the old way" (reminiscent of Winnie's "old style") forming an unbroken Celtic knot. Finally Flo says, "I can feel the rings", though none are apparent.

== Staging ==
Beckett's directions for hand links at the end of the game

In a fashion typical of Beckett, the stage directions are exactingly detailed and precise. There are many precise numerical aspects to both the construction and staging worked out for the play. Due to the complexity of the movements throughout the piece, Beckett included a diagram of each of the characters' positioning during the performance. A diagram of the aforementioned rings, and the way they should be formed from the actors' hands, is also included. During the course of the play, each woman follows a variant set of the same basic movements performed once each involving a carefully realized silent/slow exit and reentry, shifting sitting positions on the bench, a slide to center, the whispering movements, returning to facing front, etc. This could just as easily be a mathematical or musical "set" with the same numbers/notes appearing in three different orders.

The precision of the lighting isolates the three women and obscures individual details so that the combined effect of costume, lighting and ritual movement creates a sense of intense similarity between the "individuals" comprising the trio. The one prop (the bench, described with great precision in Beckett's notes accompanying the play) is lit so as to minimize its visibility. The women take on a ghostly aspect as they glide silently and disappear/reappear into/from the surrounding darkness.

== Interpretations ==
=== General ===
The whole play's structure is circular (ring-like). It is divided into three exactly equal segments of seven lines during which a character exits and comes back in after completing their circuit, taking a different seat to the one they sat on originally. In this sense the characters also move around their seats in a ring shape.

Some speculate as to what the characters are discussing. From each response (Ru: (about Vi), "Does she not realise?" Vi: (about Flo), "Has she not been told?" Flo: (about Ru), "Does she not know?") it is not unreasonable to assume that each, perhaps, is in fact terminally ill but unaware of the fact. "The unspoken nature of the condemnation in the final version is more powerful [than in Human Wishes (see below)] precisely because it is less explicit. For while it leaves a mystery unresolved, it also tends to lead one beyond the particular illness of an individual woman to embrace the fate of all mankind." Other possibilities include a yet to be made public death or some other tragedy involving a personal connection to whatever is whispered for the absent character being whispered about.

The play might be seen as a coming of age situation. Vi yearns for the "old days", presumably when there were no awful secrets to tell but, at the same time, to which all three characters know there is no return. On one level "there is a sense of loss in the play, that the women will never regain the intimacy they once had together". Brenda Bynum, who has directed the play, feels the opposite, however: ‘Why does it have to be that they have lost something, why can it not be Beckett's longing for intimacy that they have and he can’t?’" Anthony Roche agrees: "[T]hey assert a strength through their interdependence which makes this play one of the most perfect theatrical ensembles ever devised."

The joining of the hands evokes the symbol for infinity. "The ritual gesture of clasped hands allows them to keep their secrets from each other, but the feeling of the rings evokes the cycle of time. Twice turned upon itself, the bond of the three women (forever linked in their untold secrets) is never again what it was, never again what it seems to be. Something is the same, and everything is different." "Superficially they make us think of the Three Graces as they link hands, but, more precisely, they resemble in appearance the three mothers in Fritz Lang's M, a film much loved by Beckett."

Whereas at the start of the play there is a reluctance to talk of the past, after each of the shocking revelations the three women willingly drift off into nostalgia as a means of coping with the present.

The rings that Flo says she feels "may be imagined a symbol of the frustrated hopes of youth, of marriages that never occurred [or failed] or equally their eternal union" that has kept them together throughout their personal tragedies. Or, perhaps, these women meet/exist outside of time and whatever rings they might have once worn have disappeared along the way.

"Ethereal though the women of Come and Go might be, they are substantial personae in comparison with the wraith-like beings of the ‘supplication plays.’ And painful though the shock to their sensibilities has been, they have the comforting presence of each other to offset their sadness. They comprise a community, and are therefore not wholly reliant on memory to remedy or sedate. No such comfort is available in the later dramaticules, however, where night after night alienated beings implore their loved ones to make their presence felt."

Ru and Flo's names bring to mind the verbs 'rue' and 'flow' respectively, which hold certain applicable implications to what transpires.

=== Shakespeare ===
Vi's opening line ("When did we three last meet?") recalls that of Shakespeare's Three Witches ("When shall we three meet again?" - Macbeth: Act 1, Scene 1) and Ru and Vi's names recall the names of Ophelia's flowers in her mad scene. ("There’s rue for you, and here’s some for me; we may call it herb of grace o’ Sundays", "I would give you some violets, but they withered all when my father died." Hamlet - Act 4, Scene 5).

== Background ==
"Morehampton House, [in Dublin] had originally been run by three spinster sisters and was commonly known … as "Miss Wade's." When Shelia and Molly Roe – Beckett's cousins – attended there during the First World War, "the school was run by two elderly ladies called Miss Irwin and Miss Molyneaux."

== Related texts ==
=== Human Wishes ===
In 1936 Beckett began a full-length play entitled Human Wishes (after the poem by Dr Johnson, Vanity of Human Wishes). It was abandoned but in 1980 he allowed a fragment of this is to be published in Ruby Cohn's Just Play and was later made more widely available in Disjecta: Miscellaneous Writings and a Dramatic Fragment edited by Cohn.

"When the curtain rises, three women are seated, presumably encircled by the long gowns of the time [18th Century]. Mrs Williams is meditating, Mrs Desmoulins is knitting and Miss Carmichael is reading. During the course of the scene the latter two rise and temporarily leave their seats, but Mrs Williams's actions are confined to striking the floor with her stick."

Beckett may have been "motivated by the theme he clearly wishes to pursue: Johnson in love" but that is not what he ended up writing about. "The "three women look as though they might have emerged from tragedy. Their dialogue – especially Mrs Williams's lines – occasionally recalls Restoration comedy, but its substratum is human mortality, without hope of restoration. [On the other hand r]ather than … explicit references to death, Come and Go spirals delicately around absence and threat." "However, more than death, it is ‘the peevishness of decay’ that pervades the scene, illustrated by the petty bickering and punctuated by the repeated silences that threaten to stop what action there is." "The play fragment also points forward … to the elegant, old-fashioned language and formalised syntax of the three women in Come and Go."

=== Good Heavens ===
Flo, Vi, and Ru began their life as Viola, Rose and Poppy in a typescript now held at Reading University Library headed ‘Scene 1’. Poppy reads aloud from a titillating book, interrupted at intervals by the others. The revue-like style bears little resemblance to the finished work but it is clearly its genesis. The finished work "Come and Go" is extraordinary in its seeming simplicity built upon a rigorous and meticulous structure which has remarkable musical aspects in its formal discipline and clarity. Detailed analysis (identical to musical analysis of a score) is revelatory regarding Beckett's bridging the gap between composing with notes and writing with words/images. The parallels with specific musical techniques/terminology such as cells, permutations, variants, inversions, codas, counterpoint, dynamics, etc. are uncanny. The final structure of Come and Go could easily be the precise basis for a well-balanced and rigorously formal musical composition.

In subsequent drafts Beckett adds a title, Type of Confidence, which he changes to Good Heavens; the names also vanish to be replaced by the letters A, B and C. "Beckett began the play clearly with the structure of three confidential gossips clearly in mind … before going on to draft the play in full … Good Heavens is almost complete, apart from the final conversation between C and A. In both texts the conversation centres on two secrets: first how each woman manages to achieve her apparently flawless complexion and secondly the fact that the absent member of the trio is suffering from a terminal illness … The difference between what is said face to face and what is said behind the back of the missing person reveals both a devastating feminine hypocrisy and the irony that the secret is told by someone whom the hearer already knows (or soon discovers) to be doomed also. And most ironical of all, while each woman muses upon the fate of the other two, she remains supremely unaware of her own." The final austerity achieved in the minimal text manages to reduce the triviality normally associated with "gossip." It is contained within a sustained potent atmosphere that is only briefly interrupted at the three whispering moments.

In a later draft Beckett introduces "three sorrowing husbands – all conspicuously absent from the marital home:

Rose (of Poppy):   I ran into her husband at the Gaiety. 
      He is half crazed with grief. 
Poppy (of Vi):   Her husband wrote me from Madeira. 
      He is heartbroken
Vi (of Rose):           Her husband called me from Naples. 
      He was weeping over the wire. 

The fact that the whispered secret in Come and Go relates to life expectancy is made "more explicit [in Good Heavens], even spelling out the terminal date of the third friend's incurable ailment (‘Three months. At the outside … Not a suspicion. She thinks it is heartburn’)."

=== Eleuthéria ===
"The three women [in Eleuthéria], Mesdames Krap, Meck and Piouk, look forward to Flo, Vi and Ru in Come and Go in their repeated concern for each other's appearance and health; in addition, like the women of the later short play, two of them, Violette and Marguerite, have flower-inspired Christian names."
