= Pilcer =

Pilcer is a surname. Notable people with the surname include:

- Harry Pilcer (1885–1961), American actor, dancer, choreographer, and lyricist
- Sonia Pilcer, American author, playwright, and poet
