= Robin Saikia =

British travel writer and historian

- Occupation: Author
- Website: robinsaikia.wordpress.com

Robin Saikia is a British travel writer and historian.

== Biography ==
Robin Saikia was born in 1962 and educated at Winchester College. His mother's side is English and his father's side is of Indian Assamese ancestry. He grew up in England, Zambia and India.

== Books ==
Robin Saikia wrote The Venice Lido, a guide to Venice's beach resort. He compiled Blue Guide Literary Companion London, an anthology of poetry and prose excerpts written in and about London. His latest Blue Guide travel monograph, published in 2024, is Drink and Think Venice: The Story of Venice in Twenty-Six Bars and Cafés. Some of the other Blue Guides which he has written are Blue Guide Hay-on-Wye, and Blue Guide Italy Food Companion: Phrasebook & Miscellany.

He also wrote The Red Book: The Membership List of The Right Club about "upper-class English anti-Semitism during Hitler's rise to power."

He was editor of The Horn Book: A Victorian Sex Manual, was co-editor, with Joachim Von Halasz, of Munich: A Third Reich Tourist Guide and was a contributor, with Charles James Lyall and Abu Zazariya Yahya Al-Tibrizi, to A Commentary on Ten Ancient Arabic Poems.

Saikia also wrote A Very Fine Cat Indeed: A Dramatic Monologue which features the eighteenth century English writer Samuel Johnson reminiscing about his cat "Hodge".

Saikia has published a book on the elocution of British English, entitled The Saikia System: 23 Elocution Exercises for Teachers and Students of Standard British English.
