= Branxton =

Branxton can refer to:

- Branxton, New South Wales, Australia
- Branxton, Northumberland, England
