= Heliotrope Books =

Independent publisher in New York City, U.S.

Heliotrope Books is an independent publisher based in Lower Manhattan. Founded and operated by Naomi Rosenblatt, Heliotrope specializes in cross-genre books with mixed sales categories, memoirs by journalists (including the "memoir-noir", a category coined by Heliotrope), and fiction set in New York City. Heliotrope also publishes a line of children's books under the imprint HelioTot. Notable authors include humorist entrepreneur Richard A. Moran; award-winning professor and bestselling memoirist Susan Shapiro; Catherine Hiller, novelist, filmmaker, and author of the notable marijuana memoir Just Say Yes; novelist, poet, and playwright Sonia Pilcer; author, playwright, and actor Don Cummings, and international foraging expert Leda Meredith.

As a New York City press, Heliotrope works closely with neighborhood bookshops and local entertainment venues including The Strand Bookstore, Book Culture, Dixon Place, The Red Room at KGB Bar, and Theatre 80 St. Marks.

== Awards ==
- Foreword Indies Winner / Bronze, Religion, 2018 - To the Moon and Back
- London Book Fair, Honorable Mention, 2018 - To the Moon and Back
- Family Choice Award, 2015 - The Rainbow Remembers The Music
- Guernica Magazine Pick of 2013 - Fame Shark
