= Melvin Cohn =

American immunologist (1922–2018)

- Born: 1922; New York City, New York, US
- Died: October 23, 2018 (aged 96); San Diego, California, US
- Education: New York University (PhD, 1949)
- Spouses: Ruby Cohn (m. 1946; div. 1961): Suzanne Bourgeois
- Awards: Elanco Research Award (1956); Sandoz Prize (1995)
- Scientific career
- Fields: Immunology
- Institutions: Pasteur Institute; Washington University in St. Louis; Stanford University; Salk Institute

Melvin Cohn (1922 – October 23, 2018) was an American immunologist who co-founded the Salk Institute for Biological Studies in La Jolla, California. He demonstrated that immunoglobulins and white blood cells interact directly with pathogens to protect the body from infection, and is considered a pioneer in the research of regulation of gene expression.

== Early life ==
Cohn was born in New York City in 1922. Although both of his parents worked in law, he chose to study physics at the City College of New York. After graduating in 1940, he entered the graduate school of Columbia University and earned his master's degree in chemistry.

During World War II, Cohn was drafted into the United States Army and served in a medical research unit in the Pacific Theater. After the end of the war, he was sent to Hiroshima, Japan, in 1945 to study the after-effects of the atomic bombing of the city. He also diagnosed patients affected by a major diphtheria epidemic in the country.

After being discharged from the army in 1946, he attended New York University and earned his Ph.D. in biochemistry in 1949 with a specialization in immunoglobulins.

== Career ==
From 1949 Cohn worked in Paris, France, at the Pasteur Institute, researching genes and cells with the French scientist Jacques Monod, who later won the Nobel Prize in Physiology or Medicine.

From 1955 to 1958, Cohn served as professor of microbiology at the Washington University School of Medicine in St. Louis, Missouri. In 1959, he moved to Stanford University School of Medicine in Palo Alto, California, where he was professor of biochemistry. Cohn's reputation as a leading researcher in molecular biology attracted the attention of Jonas Salk, who was planning to build the Salk Institute for Biological Studies. They struck a friendship as Cohn drove Salk around the San Francisco Bay Area looking at potential sites.

In 1961, when Salk decided to build his institute in La Jolla, California, he invited Cohn and Renato Dulbecco to serve as co-founders, which they both accepted despite the risks involved in joining a new venture that was still short of money. Cohn's wife, biologist Suzanne Bourgeois, also joined them.

Cohn studied the immune system at the Salk Institute for the next 57 years. He demonstrated that immunoglobulins and white blood cells react directly to pathogens to protect the body from infection, and developed computer models to predict the immune system's response to infections.

== Personal life ==
Cohn married Ruby Burman, a theater scholar and authority on Samuel Beckett, in 1946. They divorced in 1961. He later married again, to biologist Suzanne Bourgeois.

Cohn died in San Diego, California, on October 23, 2018, at the age of 96.

== Honors and recognition ==
Some of the honors and awards Cohn had received:

- Eli Lilly and Company-Elanco Research Award (1956)
- Honorary Member of the Scandinavian Society for Immunology (1978)
- Member of the American Academy of Arts and Sciences (1980)
- Sandoz Prize in Basic Immunology (1995)
