= Disjecta (book) =

Essay collection by Samuel Beckett

Disjecta: Miscellaneous Writings and a Dramatic Fragment (John Calder, 1983) is a collection of previously uncollected writings by Samuel Beckett, spanning his entire career. The title is derived from the Latin phrase "disjecta membra", meaning scattered remains or fragments, usually applied to written work. The essays appear in their original language of composition (English, French, or German), as stipulated by Beckett, since the volume is intended for scholars who should be able to read several languages. Beckett himself did not value these pieces much, seeing them as "mere products of friendly obligation or economic need".

The collection includes Beckett's famous essay on an early version of James Joyce's Finnegans Wake which originally appeared in Our Exagmination Round His Factification for Incamination of Work in Progress.

== Contents ==
- Foreword by Ruby Cohn

=== Part I: Essays at Esthetics ===
- Dante...Bruno.Vico..Joyce – essay on Finnegans Wake
- Le Concentrisme – an account of an imaginary poet and the movement supposedly founded by him (French)
- Excerpts from Dream of Fair to Middling Women
- German Letter of 1937 (German)
- Les Deux Besoins (French)

=== Part II: Words about Writers ===
- Other Writers
  - Mörike on Mozart
  - Feuillerat on Proust
  - Leishmann's Rilke translation
  - Thomas MacGreevy
  - Recent Irish poetry
  - Ezra Pound
  - Papini on Dante
  - Seán O'Casey
  - Censorship in the Street
  - Jack B. Yeats
  - Denis Devlin
  - McGreevy on Jack B. Yeats
- Self
  - The Possessed
  - On Murphy (to McGreevy)
  - On Murphy (to Reavy)
  - On Works to 1951
  - On Endgame
  - On Play
  - On Murphy (to Sighle Kennedy)
  - Program note for Endgame

=== Part III: Words about Painters ===
- Geer van Velde
- La Peinture des van Velde (French)
- Peintres de l'Empêchement (French)
- Three Dialogues
- Henri Hayden Homme-Peintre (French)
- Hommage à Jack B. Yeats (French)
- Henri Heyden
- Bram van Velde
- Pour Avigdor Arikha (French)

=== Part IV: Human Wishes ===
A One-Act fragment from an early historical play.

Human Wishes
- Written by: Samuel Beckett
- Characters: Mrs. Williams; Mrs. Desmoulins; Miss Carmichael; The cat Hodge; Robert Levett
- Subject: "Johnson in love"
- Setting: A room in Bolt Court, April 14th 1781

The play dramatized some episodes from the life of Samuel Johnson and takes its title from his long poem The Vanity of Human Wishes. The episodes taken dramatize Johnson's relationship with Hester Thrale, and as such, draw from her Anecdotes and Diaries rather than the traditionally more popular Life of Samuel Johnson of James Boswell. The play was abandoned after the completion of the First Act.

The only known extant fragment was given by Beckett to Ruby Cohn. Beckett left it in her Paris Hotel room shortly before the completion of her book of Beckett criticism, Just Play, the first to outline Beckett's dramatic juvenilia. The fragment was first printed as an appendix to that volume. The fragment was slightly annotated for the Disjecta collection, noting that Beckett produced a "fair copy" of the notebook material. The fragment, however, is only one of the "three full notebooks" that Beckett used while writing the play.

Beckett would reuse some of the dramatic effects, however. Critic Harold Bloom writes in his essay on Beckett in The Western Canon that the fragment, and in particular the characters' reactions to Levett's entrance, offer the first glimpses of Beckett's much later masterpieces Endgame and Waiting for Godot.
