= The Holocaust Kid =

2001 semi-autobiographical novel by Sonia Pilcer

- First edition cover
- Author: Sonia Pilcer
- Genre: Semi-autobiographical novel
- Publisher: Persea
- Publication date: July 19, 2001
- Pages: 192
- ISBN: 0-89255-261-1

The Holocaust Kid is a 2001 semi-autobiographical novel by American author Sonia Pilcer.

== Plot summary ==
The book has fifteen stories that are loosely based on the life of author Sonia Pilcer. Zosha Palovsky, who prefers to call herself Zoe, was born in Europe in a camp for DPs. She moved to New York City with her parents, Genia and Heniek, when she was a toddler. Zoe reconciles her dreams with her parents' experiences. The first story called Do You Deserve To Lie is narrated by Zoe who works for a movie magazine and does things that her parents don't appreciate. Two stories tell about how Genia was saved from the gas chambers and how she met Heniek after the war. another story describes how Heniek escaped from Auschwitz concentration camp. Other stories have to do with Zoe appreciating her parents more, marrying, and going on vacation with her parents.

== Themes ==
The Holocaust Kid explores intergenerational trauma, the complexities of second‑generation identity, and the tension between personal aspirations and inherited memory. Through Zoe's perspective, the stories examine the lingering psychological impact of the Holocaust on survivors and their children, as well as themes of assimilation, survivors guilt, resilience, and the search for belonging.

== Reception ==
The Holocaust Kid received generally positive reviews upon publication.

Kirkus Reviews praised Pilcer's blend of humor and emotional depth, highlighting the book's nuanced portrayal of second‑generation identity- "Fresh and affecting".

Publishers Weekly commended the collection's "sharp, compassionate voice" and its exploration of inherited trauma.

Booklist described the stories as insightful and emotionally resonant, noting their contribution to contemporary literature about the children of Holocaust survivors.

The book also received praise from Pulitzer Prize–winning author Oscar Hijuelos, who described it as “a life-affirming story told with verve, wit, and the kind of passion that is often missing from contemporary fiction.”

== Stage adaptation ==
Pilcer adapted The Holocaust Kid into a theatrical play. The production has been performed in the Berkshires, including a staging at Shakespeare & Company in 2007. The play is also listed in the Holocaust Theater Catalog at the University of Miami, which documents theatrical works related to Holocaust themes. The adaptation presents selected stories from the book in dramatic form, highlighting themes of second‑generation identity, inherited trauma, and the experiences of Holocaust survivors and their families.
