= Percival Stockdale =

English poet, writer and reformer (1736–1811)

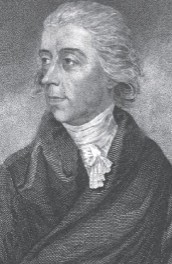
1784 portrait of Stockdale

Percival Stockdale (26 October 1736 – 14 September 1811) was an English poet, writer and reformer, active especially in opposing slavery.

== Biography ==
Born 26 October 1736 (O. S.) at Branxton, Northumberland, he was the only child of Thomas Stockdale, vicar of the parish and perpetual curate of Cornhill-on-Tweed, and his wife, Dorothy Collingwood of Murton, Northumberland. After spending six years at Alnwick grammar school, he went in 1751 to the grammar school at Berwick-upon-Tweed. He became acquainted with the Greek and Latin classics, and acquired a taste for poetry.

In October 1754, Stockdale entered the University of St Andrews, with a bursary for the united colleges of St. Leonard and St. Salvador. The death of his father in 1755 left the family with money troubles, and he accepted the offer of a lieutenancy in the Royal Welsh Fusiliers. He joined Admiral John Byng 's fleet, which anchored in the Bay of Gibraltar in May 1756. Stockdale, with part of his regiment, was on board HMS Revenge, in the expedition sent, under the command of Byng and Temple West, to the relief of the besieged garrison of St. Philip on Menorca. He returned to England in October 1756, and in November 1757 he left the army with the pretext of poor health.

Introduced to Thomas Sharp (1693–1758), archdeacon of Northumberland, Stockdale was persuaded to take holy orders. At Michaelmas 1759 he was ordained deacon by Richard Trevor, bishop of Durham. Immediately afterwards he went to London as Sharp's substitute in the curacy and lectureship of Duke's Place, near Aldgate. He mixed with London literati, meeting David Garrick, Samuel Johnson, Sir William Browne, Oliver Goldsmith, John Hawkesworth, and Lord Lyttelton. In 1767, having no church employment, he visited Italy, and resided for two years at Villafranca, where he read and wrote. [Possible correction: Wouldn't Villafranca be the Italian Villafranca di Verona, the Scaliger fortress alluded to by Shakespeare as "old Freetown" in Romeo and Juliet? (For information on Villafranca, see Richard Roe's The Shakespeare Guide to Italy.) He returned to London in 1769.

Stockdale succeeded William Guthrie in editing The Critical Review, and edited the Universal Magazine in 1771. Lord Sandwich, First Lord of the Admiralty, appointed him chaplain of HMS Resolution, a guardship lying at Spithead; he was attached to the vessel for three years. In 1779, he contributed to the Public Advertiser political letters under the signature of "Agricola". According to his own account, he missed out on the work that became Samuel Johnson's Lives of the Poets (1779–81).

After a brief time as tutor to the eldest son of Lord Craven, Stockdale was presented in 1780 by Sir Adam Gordon to the rectory of Hinxworth, Hertfordshire; while there he took priest's orders. In 1783 Lord-chancellor Thurlow presented him to the vicarage of Lesbury, Northumberland, and to this the Duke of Northumberland added the vicarage of Long Houghton, in the same county. On 28 October 1784, Archbishop John Moore conferred on him the Lambeth degree of M.A.

After paying a visit to Tangier for the sake of his health, Stockdale returned to Lesbury in 1790. His reaction to the Haitian Revolution of 1792 put him among the radical abolitionists. With William Roscoe, he defended the violence with which slaves liberated themselves.

Stockdale died at Lesbury on 14 September 1811, and was buried at Cornhill-on-Tweed.

== Works ==
Stockdale's major work was The Poet (1773), a poem. He wrote also:

- A Poetical Address to the Supreme Being (Berwick [1764]),
- The Constituents: a poem, London, 1765
- A translation of Torquato Tasso's Amyntas, 1770
- Life of Edmund Waller, prefixed to the poet's Works, 1772
- Antiquities of Greece, translation from the Latin of Lambert Bos, 1772
- Three Discourses: two against Luxury and Dissipation, one on Universal Benevolence, 1773
- Institutions, Manners, and Customs of the Ancient Nations, translation of François Sabbathier, Les Mœurs, coutumes et usages des anciens peuples (3 vols. 1770–1)
- Six Discourses, to which is prefixed an introduction containing a view of the genuine Ancient Philosophy, London, 1777
- An Enquiry into the Nature and Genuine Laws of Poetry; including a particular defence of the Writings and Genius of Mr. Pope, 1778, against An Essay on the Writings and Genius of Pope (1756, 1782) by Joseph Warton.
- Miscellanies in Prose and Verse, 1778
- Letters from Lord Rivers to Sir C. Cardigan, 1778, translation from Marie Jeanne Riccoboni
- An Examination of the Important Question whether Education at a Great School or by Private Tuition is preferable, London, 1782. The second part is an answer to Liberal Education, or a Practical Treatise on the Methods of acquiring Useful and Polite Learning (1781) by Vicesimus Knox.
- Essay on Misanthropy, 1783
- Sermons on Important and Interesting Subjects, 1784
- Ximenes, verse tragedy in five acts, not acted, 1788
- Thirteen Sermons to Seamen, preached on board H.M.S. Leander in the Bay of Gibraltar, 1791
- Letter to Granville Sharp, suggested by the present Insurrection of the Negroes in the Island of St. Domingo, 1791. A defence of the St. Domingue Slave Revolt.
- Observations on the Writings and Conduct of our present Political and Religious Reformers, 1792
- Poetical Thoughts and Views on the Banks of the Wear, 1792
- Letter to Mr. Bryant, occasioned by his late Remarks on Mr. Pope's Universal Prayer, 1793
- Edition of James Thomson's Seasons, with biography, 1793
- Letter to a Gentleman of the Philanthropic Society on the Liberty of the Press, 1794
- The Invincible Island: a poem, with introductory Observations on the present War, 1797
- Letters between the Honourable and Right Reverend Shute, by Divine Providence, Lord Bishop of Durham ... and Percival Stockdale, 1798
- A Discourse on the Duties and Advantages of Old Age, Alnwick, 1801
- A Remonstrance against Inhumanity to Animals, and particularly against the Savage Practice of Bull-Baiting, Alnwick, 1802
- Verses on the abolition of the slave trade, 1804
- Lectures on the truly eminent English Poets, 1807
- Poems, a selection, 1808
- Memoirs of his Life and Writings, containing many interesting Anecdotes of the Illustrious Men with whom he was connected, 2 vols. 1809.
- A letter from Percival Stockdale to Granville Sharp, Esq., suggested to the authour by the present insurrection of the Negroes in the island of St. Domingo. , 1811

Stockdale famously eulogized Samuel Johnson's cat Hodge in his An Elegy on a Friend's Favourite Cat. The poem appeared in the Universal Magazine for May 1771.
