= Strings (2004 film) =

2004 mythic fantasy film

- Directed by: Anders Rønnow Klarlund
- Written by: Naja Marie Aidt
- Story by: Anders Rønnow Klarlund
- Produced by: Niels Bald
- Starring: Jens Jacob Tychsen; Iben Hjejle; Henning Moritzen; Jesper Langberg
- Cinematography: Kim Hattesen; Jan Weincke
- Edited by: Leif Axel Kjeldsen
- Music by: Jørgen Lauritsen
- Production companies: BOB Film Sweden AB; Bald Film; Film and Music Entertainment; Mainstream ApS; Nordisk Film; Radar Film; Sandrew Metronome Distribution; Zentropa Entertainments
- Distributed by: SF Film; Avex Inc. (Japan)
- Release dates: 4 September 2004 (Venice); 27 May 2005 (United Kingdom); 5 September 2005 (Denmark); 28 April 2007 (Japan)
- Running time: 91 minutes
- Countries: Denmark; Sweden; Norway; United Kingdom
- Languages: Danish; English
- Budget: €3.4 million

Strings is a 2004 puppetry fantasy film directed by Anders Rønnow Klarlund about the son of an ostensibly assassinated ruler who sets out to avenge his father but through a series of revelations comes to a much clearer understanding of the conflict between the two peoples concerned. An international co-production by Denmark, Sweden, Norway and the United Kingdom, the film was made with marionettes and the strings are part of the fictional world as life strings.

== The world of Strings ==
The fact that marionettes play the characters is incorporated into the film's fictional universe. That is, the characters are marionettes. Wide shots of the countryside reveal millions of strings stretching endlessly into the sky, each one representing an individual on earth. Nobody knows how far the strings reach or who is controlling them. As far as the characters know, the strings are controlled by a higher power.

When a string attached to a moveable limb is severed, it is analogous to amputation; the individual loses the ability to use that body part. Once a string is cut nothing can repair it or bring back to life whatever it was attached to. If the "head string" is cut, it results in permanent death.

Since nothing can reanimate a body part after its string is cut, repairs to injured individuals must be made using healthy, unsevered parts. An unfortunate collection of poor people and prisoners is kept as a donor class. When a person of royalty or other social importance loses a body part, another is involuntarily taken from a prisoner and replaced with its string intact.

Prisons are designed around the fact that the strings reach up endlessly into the sky. Rather than cells, the prisoners are confined underneath huge horizontal grids, and the range of mobility allowed by their strings is limited by small square openings in the grid through which the strings are inserted and locked within.

Instead of giving birth, a couple fashions a new child out of wood. After an unspecified amount of time, a set of luminous new strings gently descends from the sky and is quickly attached to the inanimate infant by the parents. This act immediately and miraculously endows the inert wooden figure with life.

Later, it is also revealed that some people have discovered the ability to "leap" incredible distances and effectively fly for a short time; essentially this is analogous to the puppeteer jerking on the marionette's string and making it soar through the sky. It is only when the protagonist understands the unity of all living things, and the power of love, that he is able to acquire the skill.

== Plot ==
Hal Tara, the prince of Hebalon, whose father, the Kharo, dies by suicide after years of war with the Zeriths. Before dying, the Kharo writes a message asking Hal to make peace with the Zeriths and protect his sister, Jhinna. However, Hal’s uncle Nezo destroys the letter, cuts the Kharo’s remaining strings to make it look like a murder, and frames the Zeriths for the “crime” so he can seize power.

Hal sets out to find and kill the Zerith leader, Sahro, but gradually discovers that his father was responsible for terrible atrocities against the Zeriths. He also learns that his trusted general, Erito, was forced by Nezo to betray him. After meeting Zita, who is secretly Sahro, Hal begins to understand the Zeriths’ belief in love, unity, and peace.

When Hal returns to Hebalon, he discovers the truth about his father’s death and finds his sister Jhinna being executed by Nezo. Although he defeats Nezo, he cannot save Jhinna. Remembering his father’s final wish, Hal chooses to spare Nezo rather than continue the cycle of revenge.

Meanwhile, Nezo sends Ghrak to destroy the Zeriths. Hal joins Zita and the Zeriths to defend them, eventually defeating Ghrak and ending the war. Hebalon and the Zeriths are reunited, and Hal welcomes the Zeriths back to their ancestral home, Abagos. The story ends with Jhinna’s spirit being symbolically freed as her bird, Ola, finally breaks free and flies away representing the freedom and peace Jhinna had hoped for.

== Voice cast ==
Character	Danish	Swedish	English	Japanese
Hal	Jens Jacob Tychsen	Jonas Karlsson	James McAvoy	Tsuyoshi Kusanagi
Zita	Iben Hjejle	Melinda Kinnaman	Catherine McCormack	Miki Nakatani
Kahro	Henning Moritzen	Gösta Bredefeldt	Julian Glover	Masachika Ichimura
Nezo	Jesper Langberg	Sten Ljunggren	Derek Jacobi	Masatō Ibu
Ghrak	Jens Arentzen	Anders Ahlbom Rosendahl	Ian Hart	Shingo Katori
Jhinna	Marina Bouras	Jasmine Heikura	Claire Skinner	Yūka (actress)
Erito	Søren Spanning	Niklas Falk	David Harewood	Gekidan Hitori
Elke	Pernille Højmark	Marika Lagercrantz	Samantha Bond	Keiko Toda
Agra	Paul Hüttel	Måns Westfelt	Michael Culkin	Katsuya Kobayashi
Daya	Ida Hilario Jønsson	Hilda Zuber	Alexandra Knapp	
Xath	Lukas Rønnow Klarlund	Axel Zuber	Oliver Golding	
Lo	Rasmus Botoft	Jimmy Endeley		

== Production ==
Production on the film began in 2000 and spanned over four years until its release in 2004. Over 200 people worked on the film with a budget of four million euros.

== Accolades ==
Awards and nominations
Ceremony	Award	Category	Nominee	Result
Ale Kino! - International Young Audience Film Festival 2005	Golden Poznan Goat		Strings	Nominated
Emden International Film Festival 2005	Emden Film Award		Strings	Nominated
Sitges - Catalan International Film Festival 2004	Citizen Kane Award for Best Directorial Revelation		Strings	Won
Sitges - Catalan International Film Festival 2004	Grand Prize of European Fantasy Film in Silver - Special Mention		Strings	Won
Sitges - Catalan International Film Festival 2004	Best Film		Strings	Nominated
Robert Awards 2006	Best Children's Film		Strings	Won

== Release ==
The Japanese version was directed by Hideaki Anno, and the theme song was "Unexpectedly" by Misha Williams.

== Reception ==
The film currently has an 80% on Rotten Tomatoes. William Thomas of Empire wrote that ''this has real dramatic sweep and the touch of magic that makes the best fantasies more than simple escapism.''
