= Sonia Pilcer =

American author, playwright, and poet

Sonia Pilcer is an American author, playwright, and poet, best known for her semi-autobiographical novels Teen Angel and The Holocaust Kid. She is responsible for coining the term "2G" to refer to Second Generation Holocaust survivors in a 1990 essay of the same name for 7 Days magazine.

== Early life ==
The daughter of Polish-Jewish Holocaust survivors, Pilcer was born in a Displaced Persons camp in Landsberg, Germany. Her family arrived in New York City in the 1950s and moved through various neighborhoods, including the Lower East Side, Brooklyn, Washington Heights, Queens, and the Upper West Side. These locales eventually formed the settings for Pilcer's novels.

As a young student Pilcer attended the High School of Music & Art, initially intending to become a painter, but her teacher Miss Steinbach encouraged her to take up writing. Pilcer attended college at the City University of New York, where she studied English literature and philosophy, and began working as a staff writer for Ingenue and other magazines after graduation.

== Career ==
Pilcer sold her first novel, Teen Angel, in her twenties. The book was inspired by Pilcer's junior high school years in Washington Heights, where she joined a girl gang. Published in 1978, Teen Angel was optioned for film adaptation shortly afterward by Universal Studios. Pilcer co-wrote the screenplay with Garry Marshall, but the project lingered in development. As of 2015, the film adaptation remains uncompleted.

Pilcer's other works include Maiden Rites, about the misadventures of a college student from Queens in the late 1960s; the novelization of the popular teen film Little Darlings (which starred Tatum O'Neal and Kristy McNichol); and I-Land: Manhattan Monologues, a book of satiric monologues about New York living during the 1980s. Later Pilcer adapted I-Land into a theatrical play, which ran Off-Off-Broadway for six years at the Thirteenth Street Repertory Theatre.

Her book The Holocaust Kid is a collection of stories and poems that explore, like Pilcer's earlier essay "2G," what it means to be a Second Generation Holocaust survivor. The Holocaust Kid also received a theatrical adaptation, which has been performed by such companies as New York's Ensemble Studio Theatre and Shakespeare & Company in Massachusetts.

Pilcer's sixth book, The Last Hotel, was published in 2014 by Heliotrope Books. A "novel in suites," it is inspired by stories from a residential hotel that her father managed in the 1970s.

Pilcer also served as the director of the Chautauqua Writing Program. She currently teaches writing workshops in New York City and the Berkshires.

== Other work ==
Other stories and essays from Pilcer have appeared in the anthologies Sudden Flash Youth, New York Sex, Nothing Makes You Free, and Visions of America: Personal Narratives from the Promised Land. Her journalism has appeared in such outlets as the Los Angeles Times, The Forward, and The Village Voice. She received a New York Foundation of the Arts fellowship in 1987.

Pilcer also wrote for the television series Domestic Life, executive produced by Steve Martin, which aired on CBS in 1984, and The Ellen Burstyn Show, which aired on ABC in 1986.

== Selected works ==
- Teen Angel. New York: Coward, McCann & Geoghegan, Inc., 1978. ISBN 0-698-10941-4.
- Little Darlings. New York: Ballantine Books, 1980. ISBN 0-345-28894-7.
- Maiden Rites. New York: Viking Press, 1982. ISBN 0-670-45096-0.
- I-Land: Manhattan Monologues (also known as I-Land: Manhattan in Monologue). New York: Ballantine Books, 1987. ISBN 978-1-62352-046-5.
- "Shoah Casanova," in New York Sex: Stories. Jane DeLynn, ed. New York: Painted Leaf Press, 1998. ISBN 978-1-891305-03-0.
- "2G," in Visions of America: Personal Narratives from the Promised Land. Wesley Brown and Amy Ling, eds. New York: Persea Books, Inc., 1999. ISBN 0-89255-174-7.
- "Do You Deserve to Live?" in Nothing Makes You Free: Writings by Descendants of Jewish Holocaust Survivors. Melvin Jules Bukiet, ed. New York: W.W. Norton & Company, 2002. ISBN 0-393-05046-7.
- "Jew School," in Sudden Flash Youth: 65 Short Stories. Christine Perkins Hazuka, Tom Hazuka, and Mark Budman, eds. New York: Persea Books Inc., 2011. ISBN 978-0-89255-371-6.
- The Last Hotel. New York: Heliotrope Books, 2014. ISBN 0-9904012-7-8.
