= Jens Jacob Tychsen =

Danish actor (born 1975)

- Born: 19 November 1975 (age 50); Aarhus, Denmark
- Occupation: Actor

Jens Jacob Tychsen (born 19 November 1975) is a Danish actor of stage and screen, voice actor in dubbed films, and voice director. He became known for his roles as Erling Krabbe in the Danish TV series The Killing (2009), as Jacob Kruse in Borgen (2011–2012), and as Edward Weyse in Seaside Hotel (2014-2024).

== Early life and education ==
Jens Jacob Tychsen was born in Aarhus, Denmark, on 19 November 1975, the son of podiatrist and photo model Elisa Victoria Tychsen.

Tychsen graduated from the School of Acting at Aarhus Theatre in 1998 and has since appeared in a number of productions in theatres across the country.

== Career ==
In 1998, Tychsen was involved with Aarhus Theatre, where he starred in plays like The Last Temptations, Les Misérables, Servant of Two Masters, and A Clockwork Orange.

He played Erling Krabbe in the TV series The Killing (series 2, 2009), and Jacob Kruse in Borgen (2011–2012).

He has also lent his voice to numerous commercials, documentaries, and animated films, including the Danish versions of various Disney films such as Hercules, Finding Nemo, The Incredibles, Cinderella II: Dreams Come True and Toy Story 2.

== Personal life ==
Tychsen is the partner of TV production company caster Blu Anette Toftgaard.

== Selected filmography ==
=== Feature films ===
- Aftermath (2004) – Waiter
- Strings (2005) – Hal Tara
- Paddington (2015) – Policeman
- Mugge & Vejfesten (2019) – Mugge (voice)

=== TV series ===
- Unit One (Rejseholdet), Episodes 29–30 (2002) – Simon Friis
- Hidden Track, Episodes 22–23 (2003) – Joe Smith
- Krøniken, Episode 10 (2004) – Lawaetz Radio Voice (voice)
- 2900 Happiness, Episodes 37–41 (2007) – Lars Fromberg
- Summer, Episode 7 (2008) – Niels
- The Killing II, Episodes 1–10 (2009) – Erling Krabbe
- Borgen (2011–2012) – Jacob Kruse
- Seaside Hotel (Badehotellet; 2014-2024) – Edward Weyse

=== Dubbing ===
- Hercules, Danish version (1997) – adult Hercules
- Elmo's World, Danish version (1998) – Kermit
- SpongeBob SquarePants, Danish version (1999) – SpongeBob
- Toy Story 2, Danish version (1999)
- Play with Me Sesame, Danish version (2002) – Various characters
- Finding Nemo, Danish version (2003)
- LazyTown, Danish version (2004)
- Johnny Test, Danish version (2005) – Dukey
- The Simpsons Movie, Danish version (2007) – Krusty the Clown, Lenny
- Alvin and the Chipmunks (2007) – Simon
- Monsters University (2013) – Randall Boggs
- Kitty Is Not a Cat Danish version (2018) – Mr. Clean

=== Voice director ===
- Elmo's World, Danish version (1998)
- Play with Me Sesame, Danish version (2002)
