= Branxton, Northumberland =

Village in Northumberland, England

Coordinates: 55.6309°N 2.1683°W

Branxton
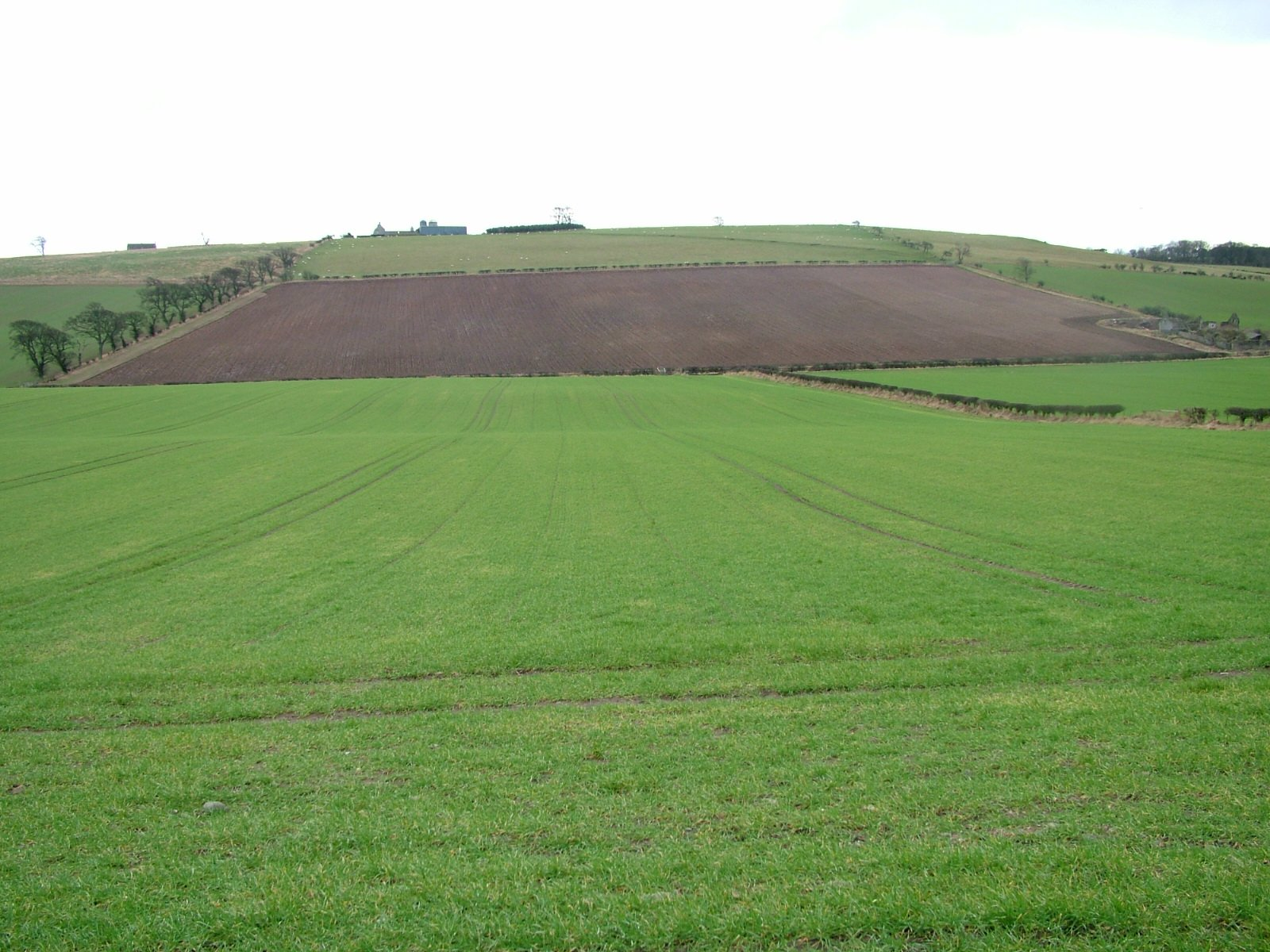
- Flodden Field, looking south-south-east from the monument erected in 1910. The Scottish army advanced down the ploughed field and the English army down the grassy field in the foreground; presumably, they met at the valley boundary between the two fields.

- Location within Northumberland
- Population: 123 (2011)
- OS grid reference: NT895375
- Civil parish: Branxton
- Unitary authority: Northumberland
- Ceremonial county: Northumberland
- Region: North East
- Country: England
- Sovereign state: United Kingdom
- Post town: CORNHILL-ON-TWEED
- Postcode district: TD12
- Dialling code: 01890
- Police: Northumbria
- Fire: Northumberland
- Ambulance: North East
- UK Parliament: North Northumberland

Branxton is a village and civil parish in northern Northumberland, England. It lies about 3 miles (5 km) from the England-Scotland border and about 4 miles (6 km) from the Scottish border town of Coldstream, just off the A697 Newcastle-Edinburgh road. At the 2011 Census, the population of the parish was 123, increasing slightly from 121 at the 2001 Census.

== Landmarks ==
Branxton is very close to the site of the Battle of Flodden, fought on 9 September 1513 between Scotland and England, the latter prevailing. A granite cross on the nearby Piper Hill (UK map reference NT890373) commemorates the battle. In 2013, the local community commemorated the 500-year anniversary of the battle.

Pallinsburn House, an 18th-century country mansion, stands nearby.

There was a painted concrete menagerie in the garden of one of the houses in the village. The sculptures were made, starting in 1962, by James Beveridge to designs by retired joiner John Fairnington (d. 1981) to amuse his disabled son, Edwin. As well as animals, there are statues of Winston Churchill, T. E. Lawrence and Robert Burns, and many texts set into the plinths and pathways. It was a popular tourist attraction, with its own tea room. The menagerie was transported to the nearby Ayton Castle in 2021, where they are undergoing restoration to be displayed in the castle grounds.

== Religious sites ==
The parish church, dedicated to Saint Paul, occupies the site of an ancient church which was taken down and replaced by the present structure in 1849.

== Notable people ==
- Percival Stockdale, (1736–1811) poet, writer and reformer, especially in opposing slavery.
