= Dr Johnson's House =

Historic house museum in the City of London

Coordinates: 51°30′54″N 0°06′29″W

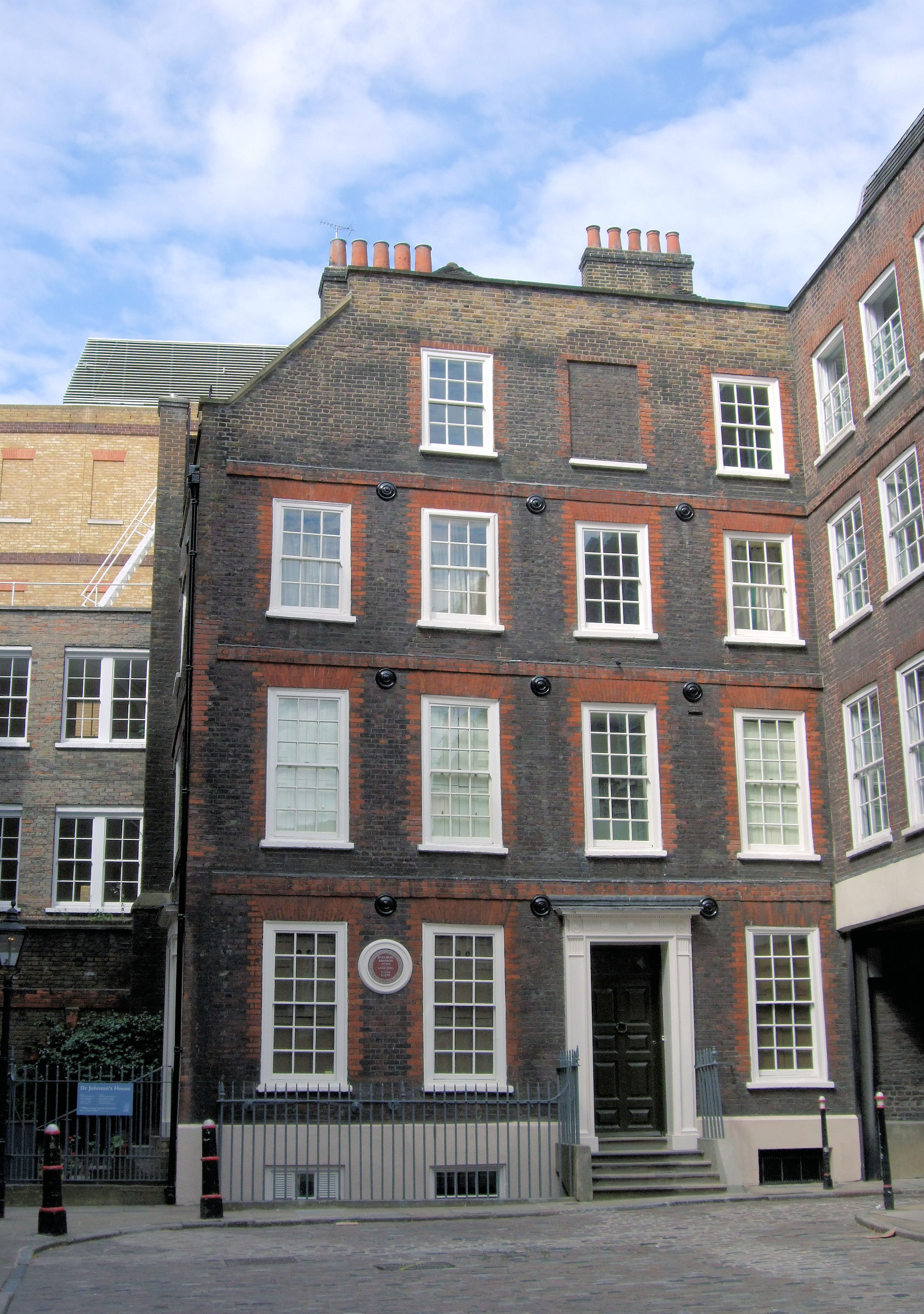
- Dr Johnson's House seen from Gough Square, in 2010

- Location within City of London

General information
- Location: City of London; London, EC4A, England, United Kingdom
- Completed: c. 1700
- Renovated: 1914
- Client: Richard Gough

Technical details
- Floor count: 5

Design and construction
- Designations: Grade I listed
- Known for: Home of Samuel Johnson from 1748 to 1759

Dr Johnson's House is a writer's house museum in the City of London in the former home of the 18th-century English writer and lexicographer Samuel Johnson. The house is a Grade I listed building.

== Description ==
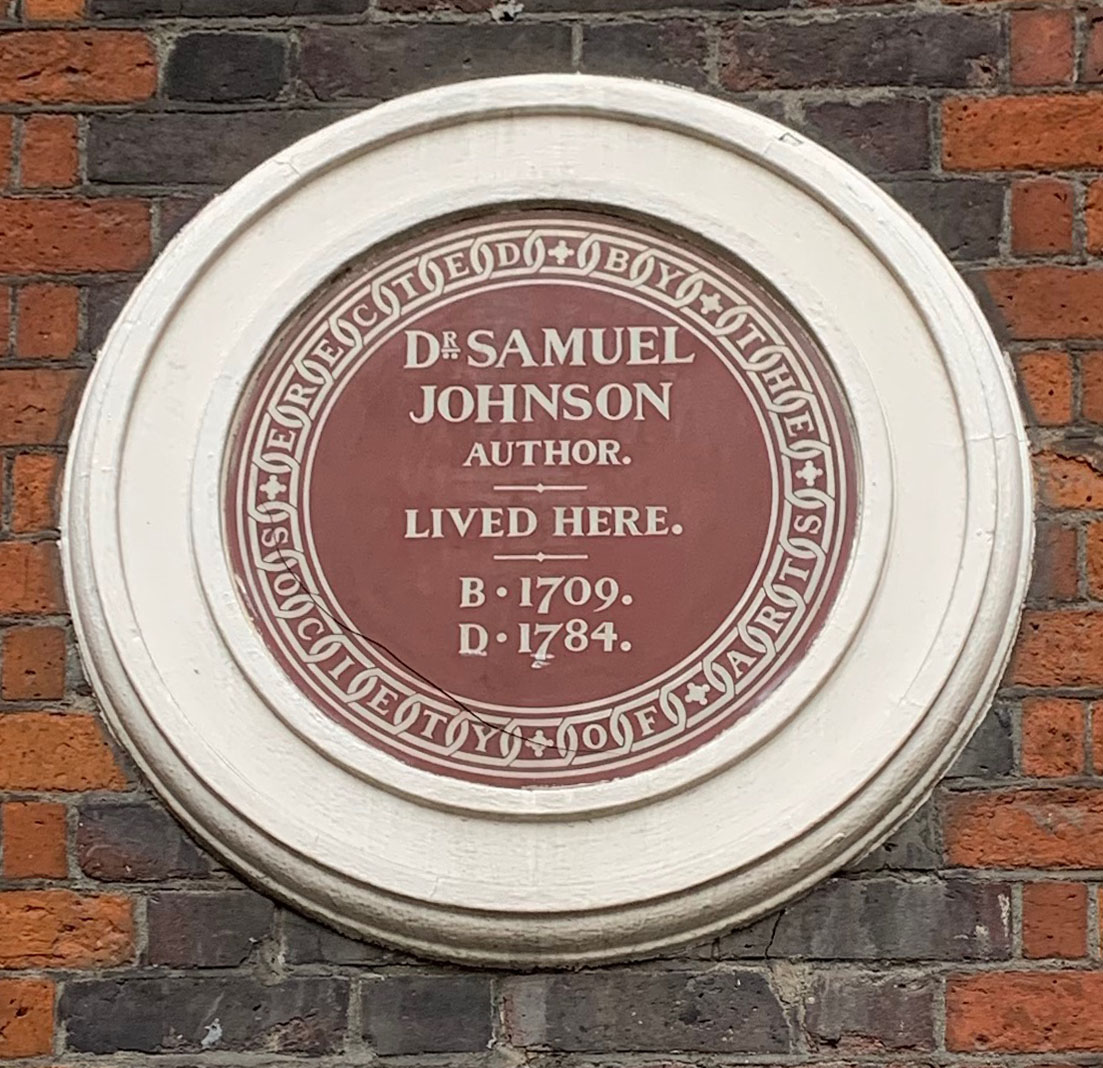
Samuel Johnson commemorative plaque at Dr Johnson's House

Built at the end of the 17th century by wool merchant Richard Gough (died 1728), it is a rare example of a house of its era which survives in the City of London (this refers only to the 'Square Mile' of the City area, as there are many other houses of this period elsewhere in Greater London) and is the only one of Johnson's 18 residences in the City to survive. Four bays wide and five stories tall, it is located at No. 17, Gough Square, a small L-shaped court, now pedestrianised, in a tangle of ancient alleyways just to the north of Fleet Street.

Johnson lived and worked in the house from 1748 to 1759, paying a rent of £30, and he compiled his famous A Dictionary of the English Language there. In the 19th century, it was used as a hotel, a print shop and a storehouse. In 1911, it was purchased by newspaper magnate and politician Cecil Harmsworth, who later commented: "At the time of my purchase of the house in April 1911, it presented every appearance of squalor and decay … It is doubtful whether in the whole of London there existed a more forlorn or dilapidated tenement." He restored the house under the direction of architect Alfred Burr and opened it to the public in 1914. It is now operated by a charitable trust, Dr Johnson's House Trust Ltd.

The house features panelled rooms, a pine staircase, and a collection of period furniture, prints and portraits. There are exhibitions about Johnson's life and work. The house has a commemorative plaque installed on its exterior by the Royal Society of Arts in 1898.

== See also ==
- Samuel Johnson Birthplace Museum in Lichfield
- Hodge (cat)
