= Catherine Hiller =

American author and filmmaker (born 1946)

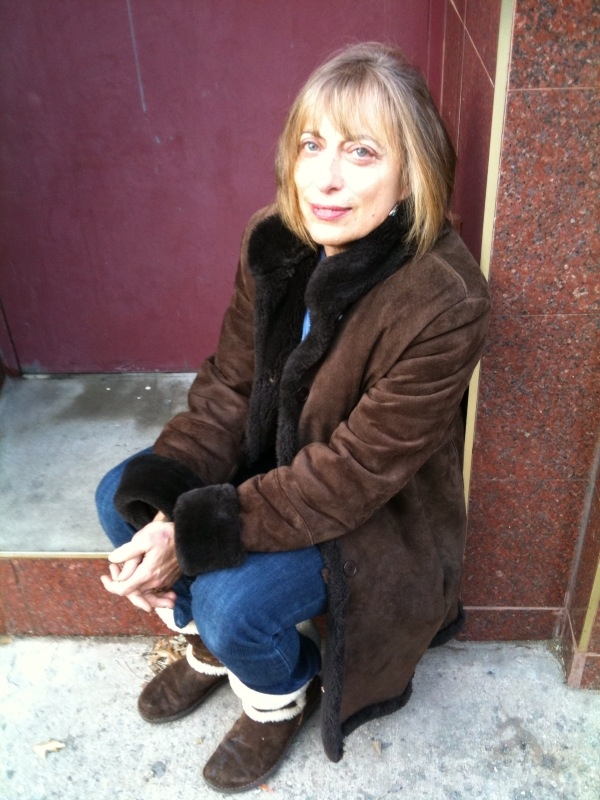
- Born: November 16, 1946 (age 79); New York City, U.S.
- Education: Hunter College High School; University of Sussex; Brooklyn College; Brown University (PhD)
- Occupations: Author; filmmaker
- Website: www.catherinehiller.net

Catherine Hiller (born November 16, 1946) is an American author and filmmaker, best known for writing Just Say Yes: A Marijuana Memoir. The first memoir about long-term cannabis use designed for a mainstream audience, Just Say Yes attracted national attention, being featured in The New York Times, Huffington Post, and Marie Claire magazine among other media outlets. In 2015, Hiller publicly "came out" as a cannabis user, saying that she has smoked marijuana almost every day for fifty years.

== Early life ==
Born in New York City, Hiller was raised in Paris, Greenwich Village, and Park Slope. She attended Hunter College High School and Sussex University, and graduated summa cum laude from Brooklyn College. She has a PhD. in English from Brown University.

In 1969, while with her then-fiancé, film editor Stan Warnow, Hiller attended the legendary Woodstock music festival with the documentary film crew. A chapter in Just Say Yes chronicles her memories of making that epochal weekend.

== Fiction ==
Hiller is the author of six books of adult fiction and two children's books, Argentaybee and the Boonie (1979) and Abracatabby (1981). Her first novel was the erotic drama An Old Friend from High School (1978), about a housewife who connects with her former friend only to start a secret love affair. The second, 17 Morton Street, was published by St. Martin's Press in 1990 and follows the love lives of three quirky sisters in New York. It became an official Book-of-the-Month Club selection. Kirkus Reviews called 17 Morton Street "an accomplished, fast-moving comedy of errors". Barbara Raskin praised the book in The Washington Post: "Catherine Hiller's writing explodes with surprising insights, juicy characterizations, and familial truths." Novelist and book critic Carolyn See said, "Catherine Hiller's voice is both fresh and very beautiful. She writes of the great dilemmas of our time - love and loss, and the wonderful ambivalence of family - with a deft mind and sure hand."

Hiller's third novel, California Time, centers on a New York family transplanted to the West Coast. (St. Martin's Press, 1993) Critical reaction to the book was mixed, with Booklist and Library Journal giving it a rave while Publishers Weekly and Kirkus believed it paled in comparison to the author's earlier work.

Hiller published Skin: Sensual Tales (Carroll & Graf), a collection of thirteen short stories, in 1997. John Updike praised the book, saying that "Catherine Hiller writes with a fine directness and clarity ... Good, brave, and joyful writing." Publishers Weekly said of the collection, "Though obviously not for the prudish, these nicely observed, gently ironic tales are a celebration of life inside and outside the epidermis." Two stories from the collection, "Skin" and "My Lover's Family", won PEN Syndicated Fiction awards.

In 2012, Hiller published The Adventures of Sid Sawyer (Armadillo Central), a retelling of Mark Twain's The Adventures of Tom Sawyer. Events from Twain's classic are revisited from the viewpoint of Tom's half-brother Sid, who in Hiller's version is the village genius while Tom is just a fun-loving bully. Ironically, twelve years before Hiller released the novel, minister and television personality Stuart Briscoe wrote the following in his essay "Why Invite Trouble": "It is impossible to imagine a book called The Adventures of Sid Sawyer. Who would want to read about a good kid who never got into trouble, never rocked a boat, never finagled his way out of a fix?"

In 2018, Hiller published The Feud (Heliotrope Books), a novel about a deadly workplace enmity that climaxes when the two women find themselves alone in a stuck elevator.

In 2020, she won first place in the Helen Schaible International Sonnet Contest, sponsored by Poets & Patrons, for a poem she wrote 50 years ago and never tried to publish.

Hiller's new novel, Cybill Unbound (Heliotrope Books, February 14, 2023) is about the sexual adventures of an older woman.

== Stories and personal essays ==
Hiller's short pieces have been published in The New York Times Sunday Review, The Westchester Review, The Antioch Review, AARP the Magazine, Redbook, and various websites including NextTribe, The Girlfriend, Purple Clover, and Green Flower. She has written several pieces for Penthouse including: "The Perfect Aphrodisiac" (February 1979); "Monogamy: The Last Taboo" (October 1979); "Sexenders" (June 1980); "Tennis Mother" (December 1980); "The Sex Tax" (April 1981); "Hypersex" (August 1981); "The Waving" (September 1981); and "The Embryo Patrol" (October 1981). The last was written at the suggestion of the National Organization for Women and was republished online by Ms. magazine in June 2022, after the Dobbs v. Jackson Women's Health Organization decision.

== Film ==
Credited as Catherine Warnow, Hiller co-produced and co-directed two acclaimed documentary films. She made Do Not Enter: The Visa War Against Ideas with distinguished producer Robert Richter. The film investigated the far-reaching effects of the McCarran Walter Act, which made it difficult for politically left-wing activists such as Gabriel García Márquez, Carlos Fuentes, and Dario Fo to visit the United States. Marquez, Fuentes, and Fo appeared in the documentary. Do Not Enter aired on PBS in 1986 and won a Blue Ribbon Award at the American Film and Video Festival. It was also nominated for Best Documentary at the Chicago International Film Festival and the Grand Jury Prize at Sundance Film Festival. The film was shown to members of Congress, helping to influence amendments made to McCarran Walter in 1991 which largely repealed the Act.

With Beat Generation scholar Regina Weinreich, Hiller also made the documentary Paul Bowles: The Complete Outsider. This portrait chronicling the life of Bowles, the expatriate author and composer of The Sheltering Sky, premiered at the Museum of Modern Art in 1994. It was released theatrically in twenty cities around the United States and broadcast on the Sundance Channel. The New York Times wrote that the film "does an especially good job of evoking the texture of Mr. Bowles's complicated marriage to his fellow author, Jane Auer Bowles". New York magazine called it "a fascinating, funny, and insightful documentary". The New York Post hailed the movie as "spellbinding", while The Washington Post called it "a fabulous film", adding, "You want to see it again and again."

== Just Say Yes and political activism ==
On April 20, 2015 ("National Weed Day"), Hiller's memoir Just Say Yes was published by Heliotrope Books. Marketed as the first "marijuana memoir" for mainstream audiences, the book illuminated Hiller's habit of smoking cannabis nearly every day for fifty years. She presents her narrative in reverse chronology, beginning in the present day and getting younger in each subsequent chapter.

Shortly before the memoir's release, an excerpt entitled "How I Buy Weed" ran in The New York Times. Responses to the article, in which Hiller explained how she had purchased marijuana from the same dealer for decades, ran the gamut from those who fully supported cannabis legalization to detractors who argued that her story was making pot too attractive to vulnerable young people. One critic wrote that Hiller was "living in a cocoon of white privilege", citing the seemingly carefree attitude with which she drove home from her dealer's house, contraband drugs in the trunk of her car. In an interview with David Gonzalez, of the New York Times, Hiller responded to the accusation: "Maybe I won't get stopped. But I wrote this [memoir] not because of my privilege, but because I think it's absurd that anyone would get stopped for this. Whatever I can do to legalize it, I will."

The Times coverage and the book itself sparked controversy as Hiller assumed her new role as a public marijuana advocate. Drug and alcohol researcher Theodore Caputi criticized her assertions that she'd had no devastating effects from long-term cannabis use, writing that she seemed to be encouraging children to engage in heavy pot-smoking. In an article for the Huffington Post, he claimed, "[Hiller's] message is unlike what you'll hear from drug liberalization advocates. It's far more dangerous." Shortly thereafter, Hiller defended herself in another Huffington Post article, stating that Caputi had "willfully misconstrued" her book. An entire chapter in Just Say Yes covers the downsides of smoking marijuana, and Hiller does direct readers to study a government webpage on addiction. Even with these disclaimers, other writers concerned with alcohol and drug studies have questioned whether Just Say Yes is promoting the idea that long-term cannabis use poses no danger.

Still, the majority of media attention Hiller received from the book was positive. Marie Claire contributor Kenny Thapoung labeled the author "cool" and touted her stories as "high adventures", In addition to extensive coverage within the cannabis community, including a five-part series for Snoop Dogg's Merry Jane and profiles in High Times and Weedist, Hiller has appeared as a marijuana expert on several programs. She was a featured guest on the Huffington Post Weird News podcast hosted by Buck Wolf and Andreas Jauregui, on The Marilu Henner Show hosted by the eponymous Broadway and TV veteran, and on Fuse TV's White Guy Talk Show hosted by Grace Parra and Saurin Choksi. On the latter, Choksi noted that Hiller has become "a lead activist" in cannabis culture. The author is a frequent speaker and writer in favor of legalization.

In 2011, Hiller, an environmental activist, was arrested with her son Jonathan Warnow in Washington, D.C. while protesting the Keystone Pipeline. She continues to work for policies that combat climate change and promote social justice. Hiller edited the medical newsletter Telemedicine Briefings, a Mary Ann Liebert newsletter, from April 2020-April 2021.

== Bibliography ==
- An Old Friend from High School. New York: Pocket Books, 1978. ISBN 0671821806.
- 17 Morton Street. New York: St. Martin's Press, 1990. ISBN 0312044208.
- California Time. New York: St. Martin's Press, 1993. ISBN 978-0-312-09760-8.
- Skin: Sensual Tales. New York: Carroll & Graf, 1997. ISBN 0786704357.
- The Adventures of Sid Sawyer. Illustrated by Ana Stankovic-Fitzgerald. London: Armadillo Central, 2012. ASIN B008J44CUI.
- Just Say Yes: A Marijuana Memoir. New York: Heliotrope Books, 2015. ISBN 978-1-942762-01-0.
- The Feud. New York: Heliotrope Books, 2018. ISBN 9781942762508.
