= Ruby Cohn =

American professor and theater scholar

Ruby Cohn (born Ruby Burman; August 13, 1922 – October 18, 2011) was an American theater scholar and a leading authority on playwright Samuel Beckett. She was a professor of Comparative Drama at the University of California, Davis for thirty years.

== Early life and education ==
Born in 1922 in Columbus, Ohio, Ruby Burman moved with her family to New York City, where she completed high school and graduated from Hunter College. During World War II she joined the WAVES and served as a document courier. After the war she returned to Europe and completed a doctoral degree at the University of Paris. In January 1953 while a student at the Sorbonne she attended the first public performance of En Attendant Godot (Waiting for Godot), by a then obscure Irish dramatist, Samuel Beckett. The play and its author became the focus of the rest of her academic life. She married microbiologist Melvin Cohn in 1946, moving with him to St. Louis. She earned a second doctorate from Washington University in St. Louis with a dissertation on Beckett which became her first book. She and her husband were amicably divorced in 1961.

== Career ==
Cohn joined the Language Arts faculty of San Francisco State University in 1961 and taught until her resignation during the student strike of 1968. She joined the theater faculty of the California Institute of the Arts in 1969, and moved to the University of California, Davis in 1972. Through her scholarship she became friends with Beckett, exchanging letters and visiting each other at least annually until his death in 1989.

== Selected works ==
- With Samuel Beckett, Samuel Beckett: The Comic Gamut (1962; Literary Licensing, 2011) ISBN 978-1-258-15413-4
- Editor, with Bernard Dukore and Haskell Block, Twentieth Century Drama: England, Ireland, the United States (Random House, 1966) ISBN 978-0-394-30141-9
- Editor, Casebook on 'Waiting for Godot' (Grove Press, 1967) ISBN 978-0-394-17266-8
- Back to Beckett, 1974
- Samuel Beckett: A Collection of Criticism (McGraw-Hill, 1975) ISBN 978-0-07-011598-9
- Just Play: Beckett's Theater, 1980
- With Samuel Beckett, Disjecta: Miscellaneous Writings and a Dramatic Fragment (Grove Press, 1984) ISBN 978-0-8021-5129-2
- New American Dramatists, 1960-1990 (Palgrave Macmillan, 1991) ISBN 978-0-312-04249-3
- From Desire to Godot (Calder Publications, 1999) ISBN 978-0-7145-4287-4
- A Beckett Canon (2001; University of Michigan Press, 2005) ISBN 978-0-472-03131-3
- Anglo-American Interplay in Recent Drama (Cambridge University Press, 2006) ISBN 978-0-521-03528-6
- Retreats from Realism in Recent English Drama (Cambridge University Press, 2009) ISBN 978-0-521-10693-1
