= Hodge (cat) =

Samuel Johnson's cat

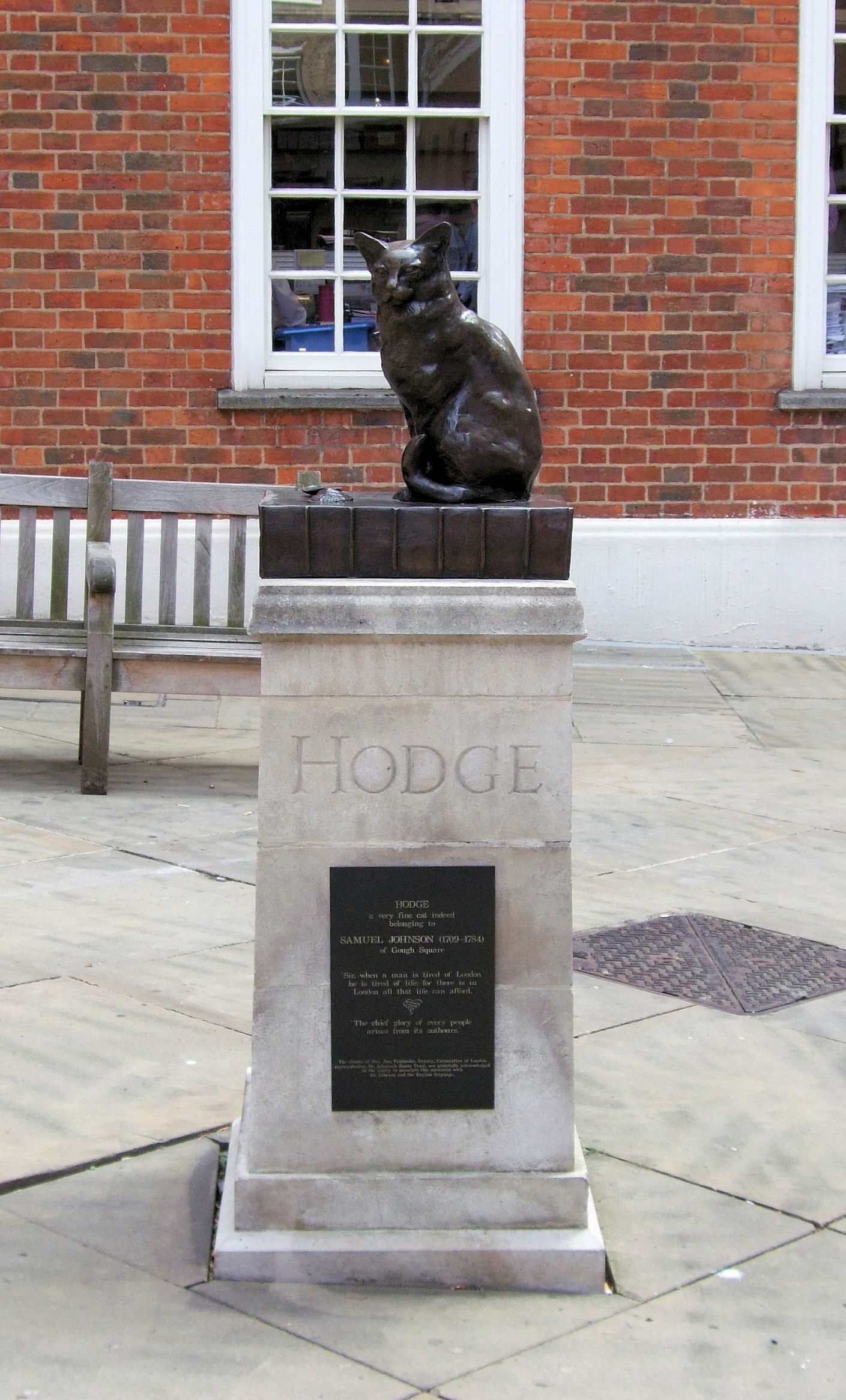
Statue of Hodge in the courtyard outside Dr Johnson's House, 17 Gough Square, London

Hodge (fl. c.1769) was one of Samuel Johnson's cats, immortalised in a characteristically whimsical passage in James Boswell's 1791 book Life of Johnson.

Although there is little known about Hodge, such as his life, his death, or any other information, what is known is Johnson's fondness for his cat, which separated Johnson from the views held by others of the eighteenth century.

== Life ==
Most of the information on Hodge comes from Boswell's account. It is in this passage that Johnson is claimed to have an affection for animals:

Nor would it be just, under this head, to omit the fondness which he showed for animals which he had taken under his protection. I never shall forget the indulgence with which he treated Hodge, his cat: for whom he himself used to go out and buy oysters, lest the servants having that trouble should take a dislike to the poor creature. I am, unluckily, one of those who have an antipathy to a cat, so that I am uneasy when in the room with one; and I own, I frequently suffered a good deal from the presence of this same Hodge. I recollect him one day scrambling up Dr. Johnson's breast, apparently with much satisfaction, while my friend smiling and half-whistling, rubbed down his back, and pulled him by the tail; and when I observed he was a fine cat, saying, "Why yes, Sir, but I have had cats whom I liked better than this;" and then as if perceiving Hodge to be out of countenance, adding, "but he is a very fine cat, a very fine cat indeed." This reminds me of the ludicrous account which he gave Mr. Langton, of the despicable state of a young Gentleman of good family. "Sir, when I heard of him last, he was running about town shooting cats." And then in a sort of kindly reverie, he bethought himself of his own favourite cat, and said, "But Hodge shan't be shot; no, no, Hodge shall not be shot."

The latter anecdote is used as the epigraph to Vladimir Nabokov's acclaimed poem/novel Pale Fire.

Johnson bought oysters for his cat. In modern England, oysters are an expensive food for the well-to-do, but in the 18th century oysters were plentiful around the coasts of England and so cheap that they were a staple food of the poor. Johnson refused to send Francis Barber to buy Hodge's food, fearing that it would be seen as degrading to his servant, so he would personally buy the food for Hodge.

Boswell also noted how Johnson went out to purchase valerian to ease Hodge's suffering as death approached. Although Hodge was not Johnson's only cat, it was Hodge whom he considered his favourite. Hodge was remembered in various forms, from biographical mentions during Johnson's life to poems written about the cat. On his death, Hodge's life was celebrated in An Elegy on The Death of Dr Johnson's Favourite Cat by Percival Stockdale (published 1778). In this poem the phrase "sable fur" indicates that Hodge was a black cat; also, the fact that Stockdale was Johnson's neighbour from 1769 onwards suggests that Hodge was alive at that time: "Who, by his master when caressed, warmly his gratitude expressed, and never failed his thanks to purr, whene'er he stroked his sable furr [sic]".

== Hodge statue ==
A Very Fine Cat Indeed
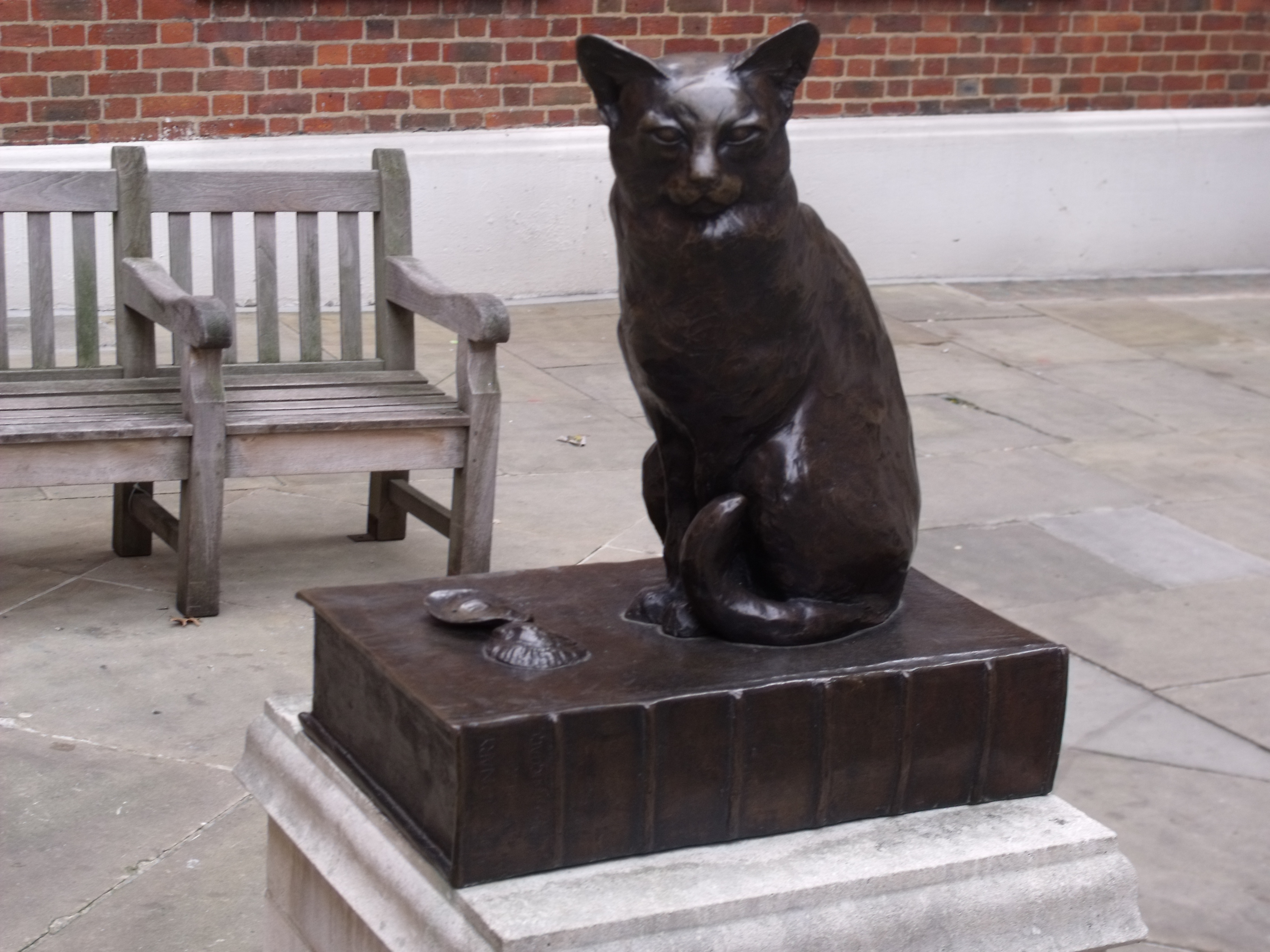
- Statue of Hodge, the cat of Dr Johnson

- Location of Gough Square within Greater London
- Artist: Jon Bickley
- Year: 1997
- Medium: Bronze sculpture
- Subject: Hodge the cat
- Location: Gough Square, City of London; 51.5150°N 0.1077°W

Today Hodge is remembered by a bronze statue, unveiled in 1997 by Sir Roger Cork, the then-Lord Mayor of London, outside the house in Gough Square he shared with Johnson and Barber, Johnson's black manservant and heir. The statue shows Hodge sitting next to a pair of empty oyster shells atop a copy of Johnson's famous dictionary, with the inscription "a very fine cat indeed". It has become customary for visitors that walk past the statue to place coins in the oyster shells as tokens of good luck. To mark special occasions and anniversaries a pink piece of counsel's ribbon may be seen tied to one of the oyster shells or around Hodge's neck.

Sculptor Jon Bickley perceived a kinship with Johnson, noting, "It seems Dr. Johnson and I were meant to come together . . . He was born in Lichfield, in the Midlands, and I was brought up just outside it. I can close my eyes and picture his birth house." Bickley modelled the cat on his own pet, Thomas Henry, and carefully selected the sculpture's height for maximum accessibility: "I made Hodge about shoulder height for the average adult, which is just about right for putting an arm around."

== Popular culture ==
The cat Hodge—along with Dr. Johnson's second favourite cat, Lily—are the subjects of a book by Yvonne Skargon (Johnson is also given authorial credit) entitled Lily and Hodge and Dr. Johnson. The book consists of quotations from Johnson's Dictionary, accompanied by Skargon's wood engravings of the two cats, contextually associated with the dictionary entries. Susan Coolidge's ode "Hodge, the Cat" celebrates Samuel Johnson's affection for Hodge; it appears in a collection of feline-focused poems and anecdotes published in 1912, and edited by Agnes Repplier. Hodge also appears in Charlie Fletcher's "Silvertongue" as a brave and fearless cat. Hodge also appears in Samuel Beckett's early dramatic fragment Human Wishes. In M. C. Beaton's Agatha Raisin novel series, the heroine's cats are named Hodge and Boswell. The English critic, essayist and poet Leigh Hunt wrote an essay entitled "The Cat by the Fire" which features an imaginary description of how some of Samuel Johnson's friends and acquaintances would have related to Hodge the cat. In December 2020, Southwark Cathedral named its newly-adopted cat Hodge, as Gough Square is nearby, and Johnson is depicted in one of the cathedral's stained glass windows.

== See also ==
- List of public art in the City of London
- List of individual cats
