= Symphony No. 9 (Glass) =

2011 symphony composed by Philip Glass

- by Philip Glass
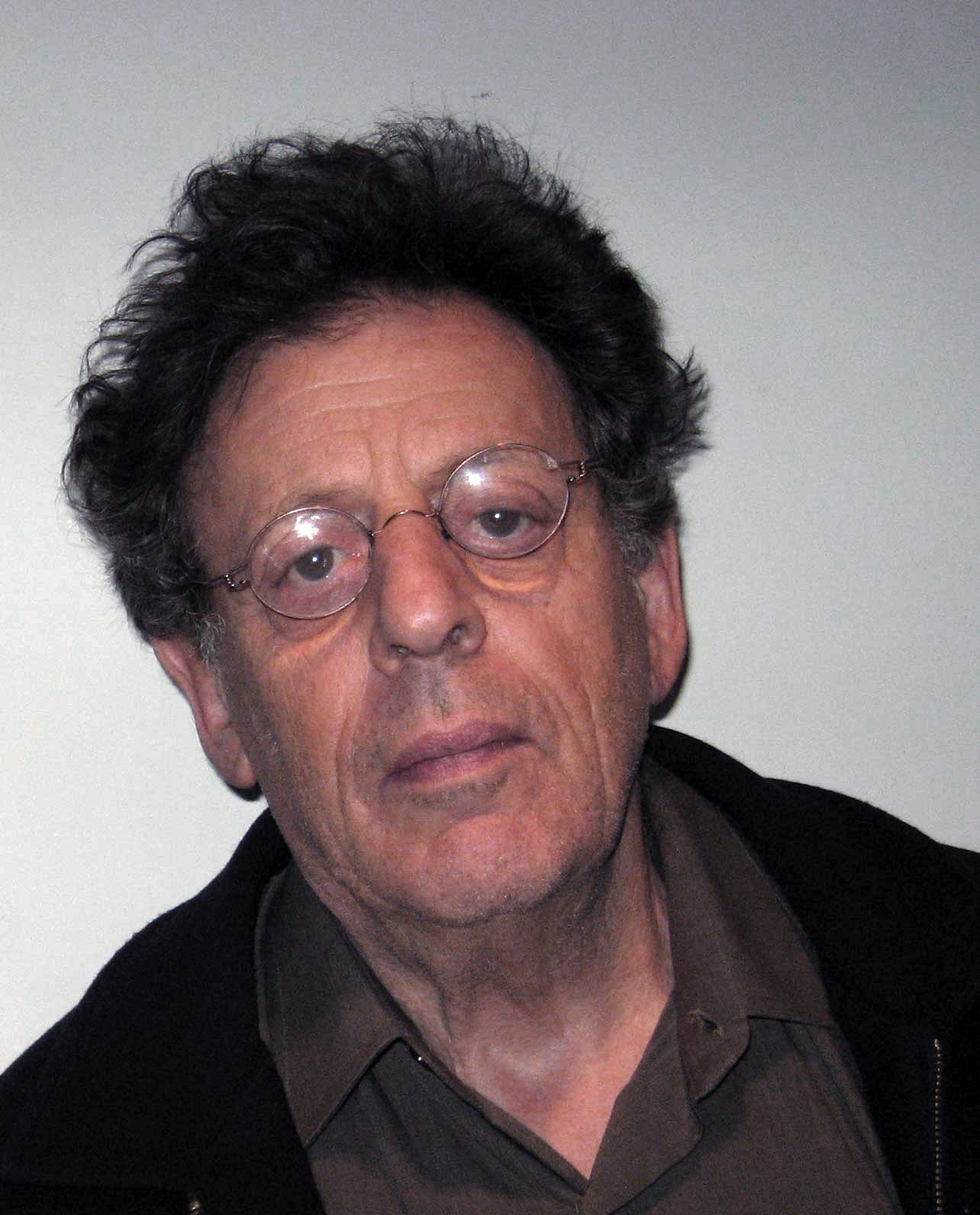
- Glass in 2007
- Period: Contemporary
- Style: Postmodern, minimalist
- Form: Symphony
- Composed: 2011
- Publisher: Dunvagen Music Publishers
- Duration: 50 minutes

Premiere
- Date: January 1, 2012
- Location: Brucknerhaus in Linz, Austria
- Conductor: Dennis Russell Davies
- Performers: Bruckner Orchester Linz

Symphony No. 9 is Philip Glass's ninth symphony. It was written between 2010 and 2011. It is written in 3 movements. The work was jointly commissioned by the Bruckner Orchester Linz, Carnegie Hall, and the Los Angeles Philharmonic Association.

The symphony premiered January 1, 2012, at Brucknerhaus in Linz, Austria, with the Bruckner Orchester Linz conducted by Dennis Russell Davies. The piece received its United States premiere January 31, 2012, at Carnegie Hall, with Dennis Russell Davies conducting the American Composers Orchestra. It premiered on the West Coast April 5, 2012, with John Adams conducting the Los Angeles Philharmonic.

== Reception ==
The symphony has been highly regarded by critics and quickly became a bestseller on iTunes following its U.S. premiere.

Mark Swed of the Los Angeles Times lauded the work, declaring it "late Glass at his most momentous, a significant symphony by America’s most significant symphonist." Richard S. Ginell of Variety also praised the work, saying, "The 50-minute-plus Ninth is not Glass’s biggest symphony – that would be the 97-minute, choral Fifth – but it is one of his more imposing pieces, three sprawling movements for a very large symphony orchestra." Andrew Clements of The Guardian was slightly more critical, but commended the work, noting, "If the music occasionally hangs fire, its craftsmanship, as ever with Glass, is exemplary."
