= Symphony No. 15 (Glass) =

21st-century symphony composed by Philip Glass

- by Philip Glass
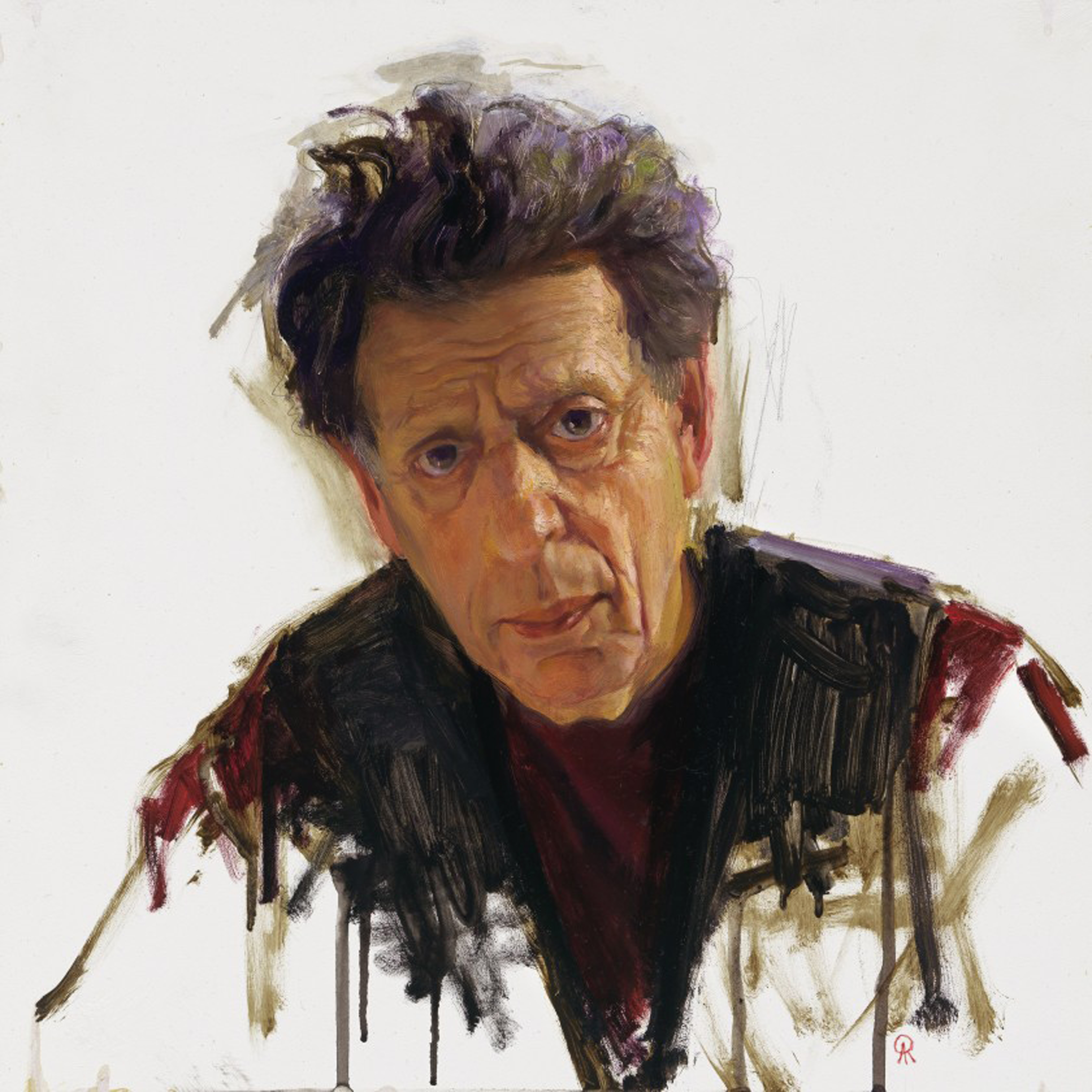
- Philip Glass by Luis Alvarez Roure, 2016
- Period: Contemporary
- Style: Postmodern, minimalist
- Form: Symphony
- Composed: 2022
- Publisher: Dunvagen Music Publishers
- Duration: 35 minutes

Premiere
- Date: July 5, 2026
- Location: Tanglewood, Massachusetts, U.S.A.
- Conductor: Karen Kamensek
- Performers: Zachary James (Baritone)

Symphony No. 15 (Lincoln) is the fifteenth symphony by American composer Philip Glass. The piece was jointly commissioned by the National Symphony Orchestra and the Kennedy Center, and portrays the life of U.S. president Abraham Lincoln. The piece was inspired by Lincoln's 1838 "Lyceum Address."

The composition consists of 8 individual movements and is orchestrated for a solo baritone and orchestra. Prior to its premiere, the piece was subject to multiple cancellations before it was performed at Tanglewood on July 5, 2026, by the Boston Symphony Orchestra, under conductor Karen Kamensek, and baritone Zachary James as soloist.

== History ==
In 2022, Glass was commissioned to compose the symphony to honor the life of President Abraham Lincoln and to celebrate the 50th Anniversary of the Kennedy Center for the Performing Arts. Prior to this piece, Glass had included Lincoln as a character in several of his works, but unlike in those older compositions, Lincoln would be the main focus. During the composing of the piece, while Glass primarily drew from the "Lyceum Address," he also took inspiration from Lincoln's later speeches and writings, such as Lincoln's Farewell Address (1861), the Emancipation Proclamation (1863), and Lincoln's final address, which had been spoken on April 11, 1865.

=== Cancellations ===
On January 27, 2026, the 188th anniversary of when Lincoln had spoken the "Lyceum Address", Glass publicly announced the cancellation of the symphony's premiere at the Kennedy Center due to his belief that the center's values didn't align with Lincoln's and were therefore in conflict with the piece's message and central meaning. The decision was made a month after the center's board voted to add Donald Trump to the facility's name. It would have made its premiere on June 12 and 13, 2026. Prior to this, the piece's debut had already been delayed and postponed several times from when it was originally scheduled in March, 2022, due to Glass failing to complete the work by the deadline.

On March 4, 2026, following the cancellation of the June premiere at the Kennedy Center and after performing at the 39th annual benefit concert of Tibet House US, where Glass served as co-director, actor Robert De Niro, a critic of Trump, began reciting excerpts from Lincoln's "Lyceum Address" on the stage of Carnegie Hall. New sources interpreted his iteration as a renewal of Lincoln's message of civility and as a warning against democracy's dangers.

=== Premiere year ===
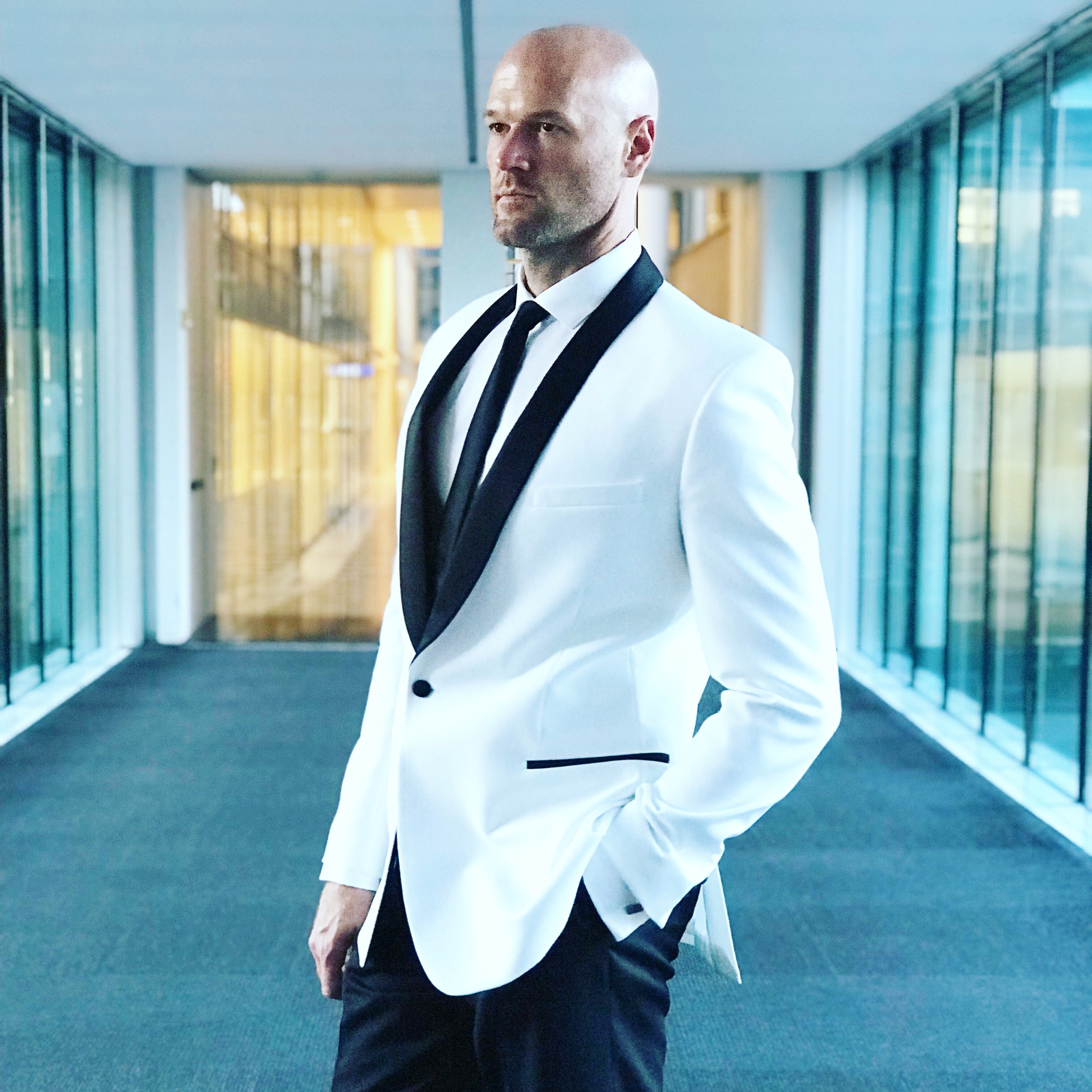
Zachary James, the premiere baritone

The piece was premiered by the Boston Symphony Orchestra at Tanglewood, on July 5, 2026, and was conducted by Karen Kamensek with baritone Zachary James as soloist; the performance commemorated the United States' 250th Anniversary and also included Copland's Lincoln Portrait (1942) narrated by Alec Baldwin, and a suite from John Williams's score for the film Lincoln.

The symphony had its West Coast premiere at the Cabrillo Festival of Contemporary Music on July 31, 2026; it was conducted by Cristian Macelaru with baritone Zachary James as soloist.

The piece will be premiered in New York by conductor Dennis Russell Davies, solo baritone Zachary James, and the Orchestra of St. Luke's, at Carnegie Hall, on Glass's 90th birthday, January 31, 2027. The New York performance was titled the "Philip Glass: The 90th Birthday Concert," and will also include Glass's Violin Concerto No. 1 and sections from Glass's opera The Voyage.

A subsequent performance by the Los Angeles Philharmonic will take place on March 12 and 13, 2027, with Anne Handler as conductor, with another performance by the Baltimore Symphony Orchestra– at Joseph Meyerhoff Symphony Hall, conducted by Jonathan Leshnoff– on June 4 and 6, 2027.

== Instrumentation and form ==
The symphony was orchestrated for solo baritone, two flutes (one flute doubling on piccolo), two oboes, two clarinets and one bass clarinet, two bassoons, four horns, three trumpets, two trombones and one bass trombone, one tuba, four percussionists, two harps, one pianist doubling on piano and celesta, and string orchestra.

The piece is approximately 35 minutes long and consists of 8 movements. Movement 1 is titled "Lyceum Address, Part 1," and is to be sung by the baritone; Movement 2 is titled "Lyceum Address, Part 2," and is to be spoken by the baritone; and Movement 3 is titled "Interlude" and left out of the libretto. Movement 4 is titled "Autobiography Part 1," and Movement 5 is titled "Autobiography Part 2." They are both to be spoken and sung and were likely inspired by Lincoln's Autobiographical Sketch from 1864. Movement 6 is titled "Slavery," Movement 7 is titled "The End of War," and Movement 8 is titled "Farewell Address." All 3 of those movements are to be both spoken and sung by the baritone.

== Reception ==
According to Jonathan Blumhofer of the Boston Classical Review, the symphony was not groundbreaking in terms of musicality and instead consisted of "arpeggiated gestures and layering of subtle metric dissonances." He stated that while this style- which had been Glass's "hallmark" for the prior 50 years- was effective, it failed to greatly emphasize the changes in tone during the piece's dramatic moments. Later in the review, he added that unstated moments in the piece were "enhanced by the essentially unflashy nature of Glass’s setting" before complimenting the composition's instrumentation, lyricism, and playfulness.

According to A. Z. Madonna of The Boston Globe, the composition "sounds like a Glass symphony" due to the use of "cycling arpeggios" and "ruminating chords." She adds that the piece differentiates from Glass's other works in that the soloist alternates between narrating and singing, in rough chronological order, with the actual writings and speeches used in the symphony. In the review's following paragraph, she states that the orchestra acts like a "static backdrop" to the soloist, but also that, due to the cutoffs in several of the piece's movements, it sounded unfinished and "caused the piece to lose sonic momentum except when the cutoff dovetailed into James speaking."

According to David Mermelstein of The Wall Street Journal, the piece "pays obvious, if unspoken, homage to Copland’s 'Lincoln Portrait,'" while also including Glass's "hallmarks": "arpeggiated figures, surging harmonies and relentless rhythms." He stated that the keyboard section was well-combined, with the strings playing a "defining role," and the brasses having "unexpectedly imaginative writing." Mermelstein also stated the piece had echos to the third movement of Glass's eleventh symphony, a "hat tip" to Charles Ives "with music recalling patriotic marches," and a "moving" coda with "gentle evanescence."

On the piece's premiere, Clarence Fanto of The Berkshire Eagle stated that while premieres by the Boston Symphony weren't rare, "Sunday's first performance of Symphony No. 15, 'Lincoln,' by Philip Glass was especially weighty and, dare we say, historic."

Premiere conductor Karen Kamensek stated that when hearing the piece, she "heard it as four columns of sound." Following this, she stated that those were the "columns that our society is built on," interpreting them as human morals and values that people can view differently from one another.
