= Symphony No. 3 (Glass) =

1995 symphony composed by Philip Glass

- by Philip Glass
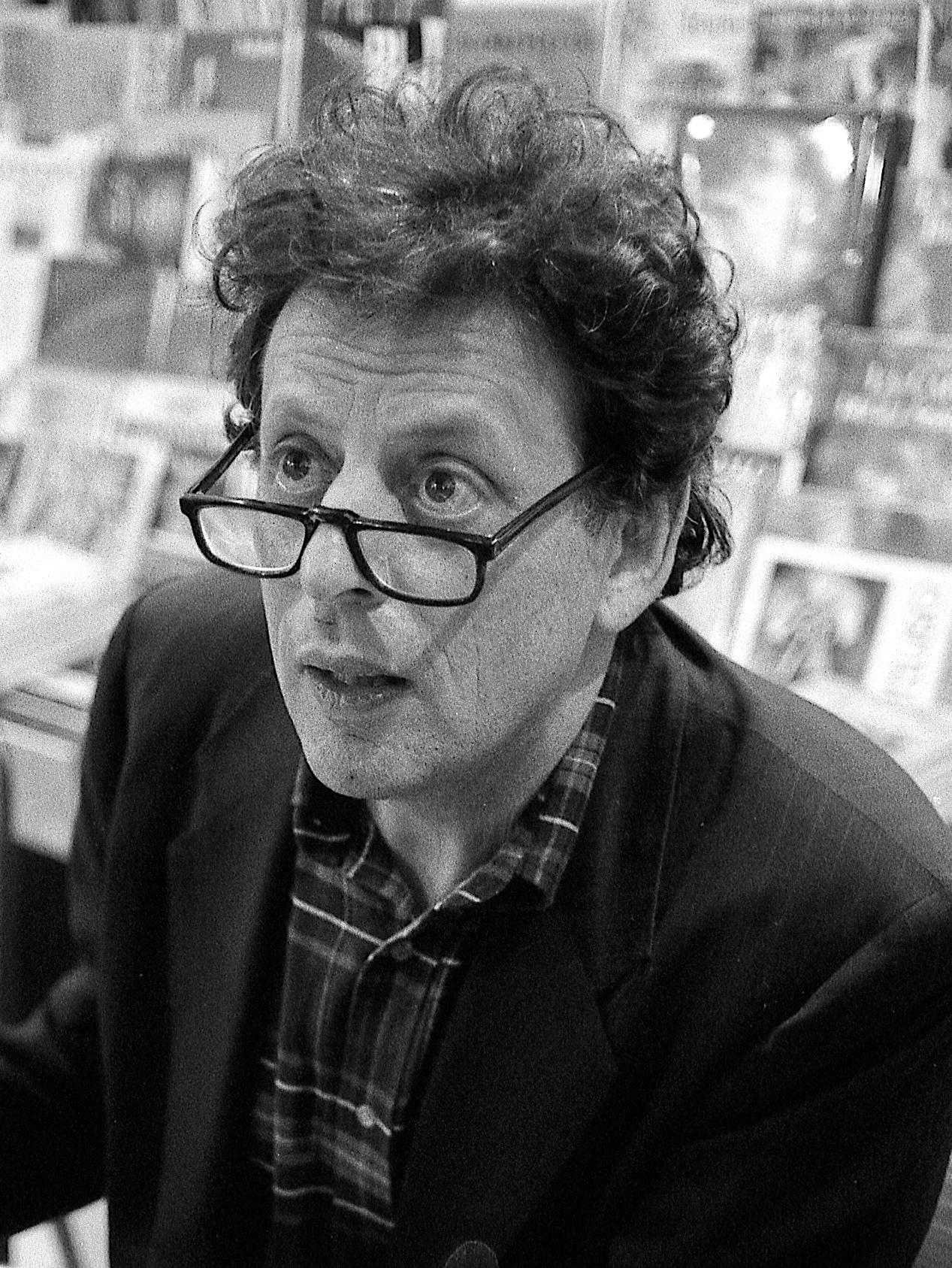
- Glass in 1993
- Period: Contemporary
- Form: Symphony
- Duration: About 25 minutes
- Movements: 4
- Scoring: String orchestra

Premiere
- Date: February 5, 1995
- Location: Künzelsau, (Germany)
- Conductor: Dennis Russell Davies

Philip Glass's Symphony No. 3 is a work for string orchestra, commissioned for the Stuttgart Chamber Orchestra. The premiere, conducted by Dennis Russell Davies, took place in Künzelsau, (Germany), on February 5, 1995.

== Form ==
The symphony is in four movements. The first movement is elemental in nature, initially based on pulsing Cs but giving way before long to contrasting scales. It is soft and brief, evocative of the composer's earlier string quartets, and acts as a prelude to the faster and more lively second movement, which begins with running quavers that immediately signal a change in texture and harmonic breadth. The movement progresses to a series of abrupt metrical changes, and ends when it moves without transition into a new closing theme with pizzicato counterpoint.

The third movement forms the core of the piece, taking the form of a dark, slow-building chaconne beginning with a ground bass in the cellos and violas. The rest of the orchestra joins the pattern with each repeat, setting in place a layered effect before a solo violin introduces a high, keening cantabile melody over the accumulated rhythmical tissue. The melody passes to a different member of the violin section with each repeat, as the other instruments continue to build the underlying structure. The melody is eventually subsumed beneath contrapuntal filigrees and trills from the rest of the violin section, disappearing almost entirely within the texture, and the movement ends abruptly once the theme has reached its peak and all instruments have been included.

The energetic fourth movement recapitulates and develops material from the end of the second, with brisk chords intersected by short chromatic runs. These chromatic sequences come to dominate as the movement progresses, taking over from the earlier chord stabs and steering the movement into its closing theme.

== Instrumentation ==
The symphony is scored for ten violins, four violas, three cellos and two basses.

An arrangement of the third movement, titled Symphony for Eight, by Cello Octet Amsterdam (formerly known as Cello Octet Conjunto Ibérico) for cello ensemble was produced in 1999.

== Overview ==
The symphony was commissioned by the Würth Foundation, and part of Glass's remit was to treat each of the nineteen string players of the Stuttgart Chamber Orchestra as a soloist. This treatment is particularly evident in the third movement, where almost every player is given a distinct line of their own, and each member of the violin section plays the main melody in their turn.

The work is considered to be one of Glass's most "classical", or "traditional" works. On this, Glass has been quoted: "The work fell naturally into a four-movement form, and even given the nature of the ensemble and solo writing, [it] seems to have the structure of a true symphony."

== See also ==
- List of compositions by Philip Glass
