= Symphony No. 2 (Glass) =

1994 symphony composed by Philip Glass

- by Philip Glass
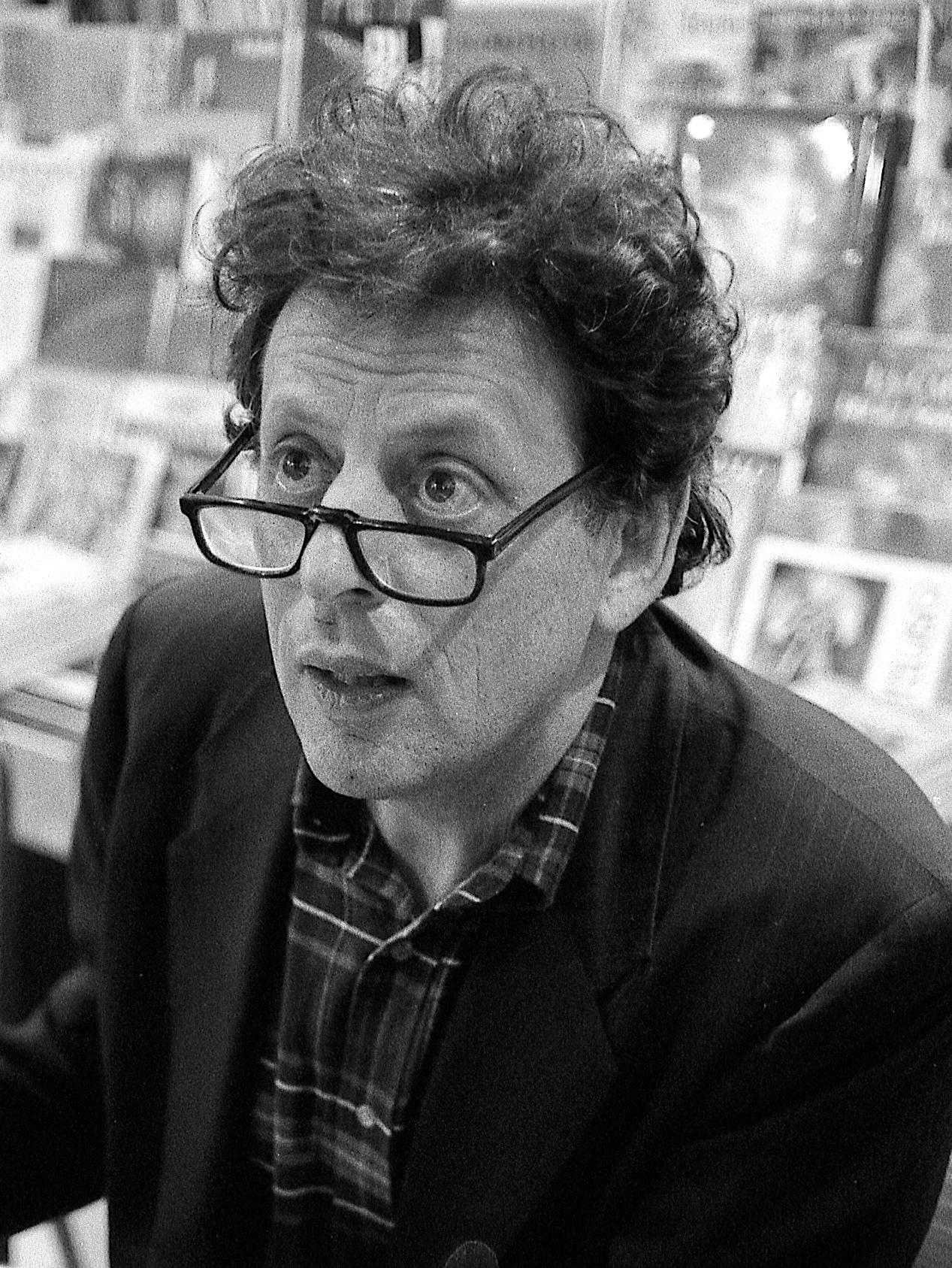
- Glass in 1993
- Period: Contemporary
- Style: Postmodern, minimalist
- Form: Symphony
- Publisher: Dunvagen Music Publishers
- Duration: 40 minutes

Premiere
- Date: October 15, 1994
- Conductor: Dennis Russell Davies
- Performers: Brooklyn Philharmonic Orchestra

Philip Glass' Symphony No. 2 was commissioned by Brooklyn Academy of Music. It was first performed on October 15, 1994, by the Brooklyn Philharmonic Orchestra, conducted by Dennis Russell Davies.

== Scoring and structure ==
The work is scored for piccolo, two flutes, two oboes doubling cor anglais, E♭ clarinet, two B♭ clarinets, bass/contrabass clarinet, two bassoons, four horns, three trumpets, three trombones, tuba, four percussionists, timpani, two harps, piano, celesta, and strings. It has three continuous movements with contrasting themes and lasts approximately 40 minutes.

According to James M Keller, "Structural experimentation and orchestral sonorities notwithstanding, the most striking aspect of Glass' Symphony No. 2 may be the ways in which melody and harmony interlock in a polytonal fashion. Glass has commented on his use of polytonality in the work: "The great experiments of polytonality carried out in the 1930s and 40s show that there's still a lot of work to be done in that area. Harmonic language and melodic language can coexist closely or at some calculated distance, and their relationship can be worked out in terms of either coexisting harmonies or ambiguous harmonies. ... I'm more interested in the ambiguous qualities that can result from polytonality — how what you hear depends on how you focus your ear, how a listener's perception of tonality can vary in the fashion of an optical illusion. We're not talking about inventing a new language, but rather inventing new perceptions of existing languages."

== See also ==
- Symphony No. 1 "Low"
- Symphony No. 4 "Heroes"
