= Symphony No. 8 (Glass) =

2005 symphony composed by Philip Glass

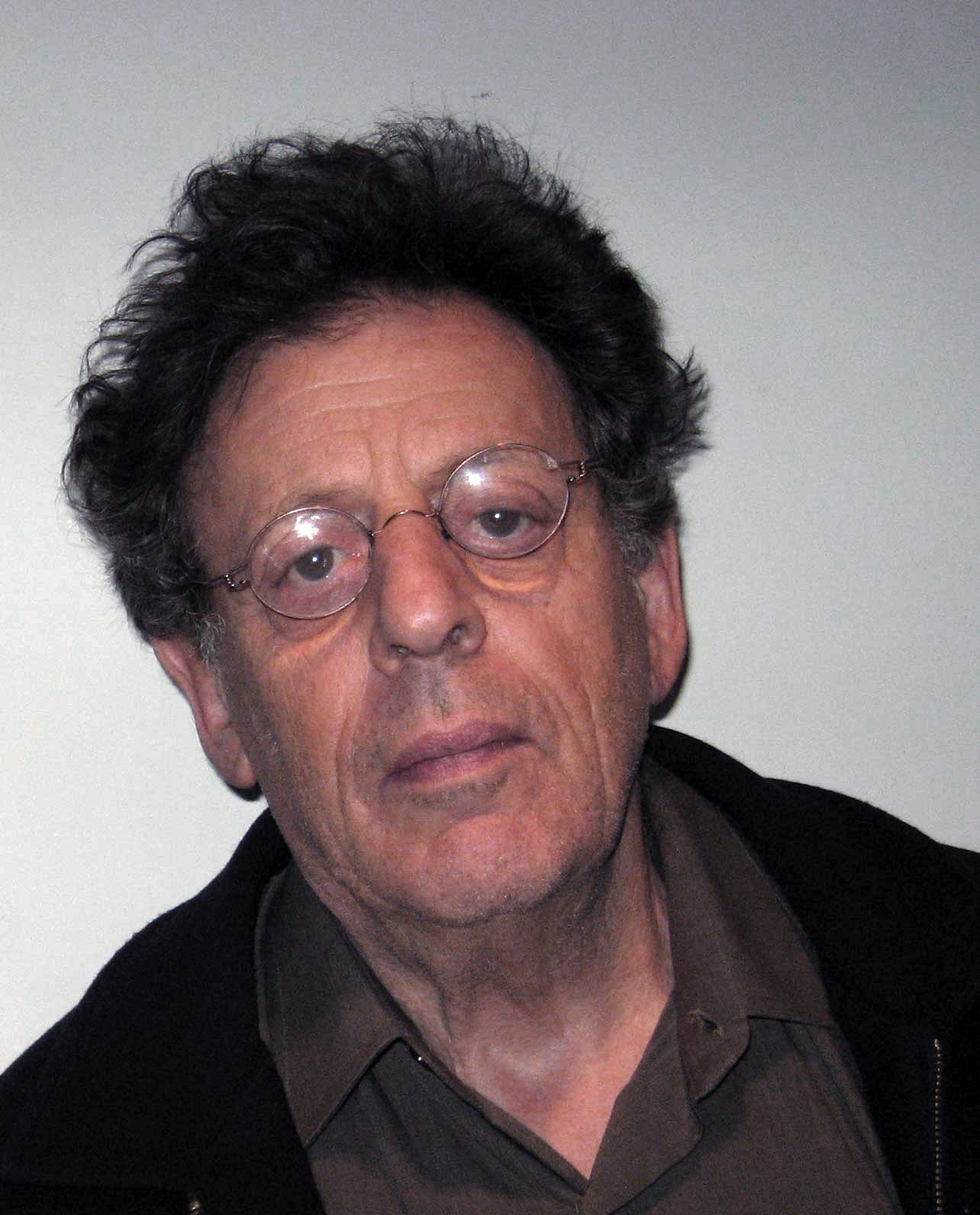
Philip Glass in 2007

Symphony No. 8 is a 2005 symphony by Philip Glass commissioned by the Bruckner Orchestra Linz. It was premiered on November 2, 2005 at Brooklyn Academy of Music by the Bruckner Orchestra Linz conducted by Dennis Russell Davies.

The symphony is in three movements and features extended solo writing. Critic Allan Kozinn described the symphony's chromaticism as more extreme, more fluid, and its themes and textures as continually changing, morphing without repetition, and praised the symphony's "unpredictable orchestration", pointing out the "beautiful flute and harp variation in the melancholy second movement".

Alex Ross remarked that "against all odds, this work succeeds in adding something certifiably new to the overstuffed annals of the classical symphony. (...) The musical material is cut from familiar fabric, but it’s striking that the composer forgoes the expected bustling conclusion and instead delves into a mood of deepening twilight and unending night."

Orchestration: 2 flutes (dbl. picc.), 2 cor anglais, 2 clarinets (E♭ & bass), 2 bassoons, 4 horns, 3 trumpets (2 in E♭), 3 trombones (2+1 bass), tuba, timp, 4 percussion (harp + piano), strings.
