= Symphony No. 11 (Glass) =

2016 symphony composed by Philip Glass

- by Philip Glass
- Period: Contemporary
- Style: Postmodern, minimalist
- Form: Symphony
- Composed: 2016
- Duration: 40 minutes

Premiere
- Date: January 31, 2017
- Location: Carnegie Hall, Manhattan, New York City
- Conductor: Dennis Russell Davies
- Performers: Bruckner Orchestra Linz

Symphony No. 11 is the eleventh symphony by the American composer Philip Glass. The work was commissioned by the Bruckner Orchestra Linz, Istanbul International Music Festival, and the Queensland Symphony Orchestra and premiered January 31, 2017, Glass's 80th birthday, with Dennis Russell Davies conducting the Bruckner Orchestra Linz at Carnegie Hall in New York City.
