= String Quartet No. 2 (Glass) =

1983 composition by Philip Glass

String Quartet No. 2, also known by its other title Company, is a string quartet by American composer Philip Glass. This composition was finished in January 1983 in New York City, and was expected to be a piece of instrumental music for Fred Neumann's adaptation of Samuel Beckett's 1979 novella with the same name.

== Composition ==
After withdrawing his first sketch of a string quartet in 1963, Philip Glass composed his String Quartet No. 2 seventeen years after his first quartet, even though it was not initially conceived as chamber music, but for theater. This work was composed as a result of Glass' collaboration with the Mabou Mines quartet, of which he married JoAnne Akalaitis, one of its members. Glass himself decided to extract the music he had written for Samuel Beckett's Company, and wrote a score thought to be a concert work on its own.

== Structure ==
This composition consists of four movements and takes approximately nine minutes to perform. The movements are listed as follows:

1. = 96
2. = 160
3. = 96
4. = 160

The main theme of this work is subjugated to arpeggios in minor keys all along the four movements. All of the movements of this monochrome work are highly and closely related to each other. This composition is written for string quartet, but has been performed by string orchestras.

== Notable recordings ==
Notable recordings of this composition include:

Orchestra	Conductor	Record Company	Year of recording	Format
Ulster Orchestra	Takuo Yuasa	Naxos	1999	CD
