= Symphony No. 5 (Glass) =

1999 symphony composed by Philip Glass

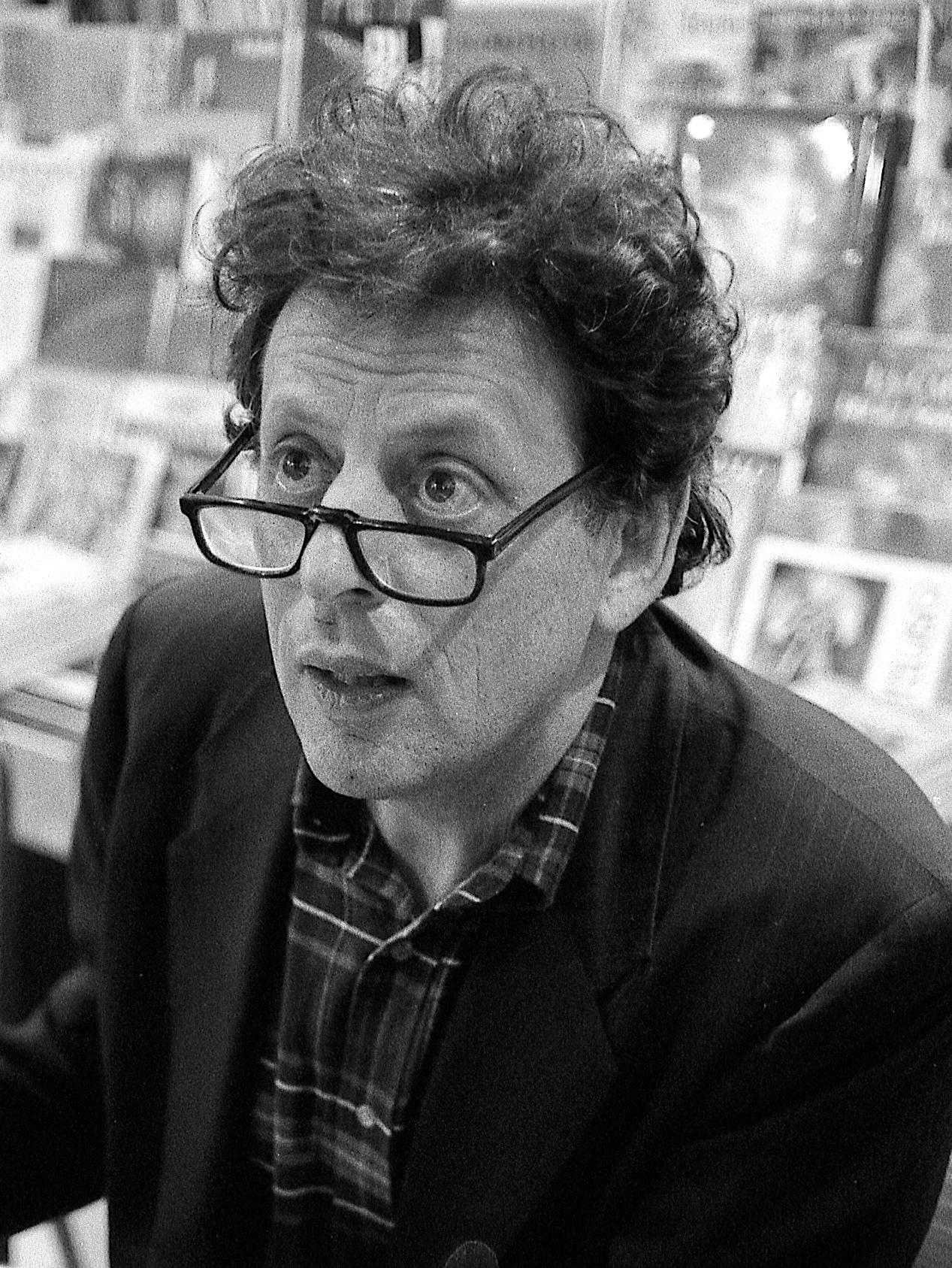
Philip Glass in 1993

Symphony No. 5 "Requiem, Bardo, Nirmanakaya" is a symphony for chorus and orchestra by the American composer Philip Glass. It was commissioned by the Salzburg Festival, Austria and premiered August 28, 1999 and was conducted by Dennis Russell Davies.

== Structure ==
The symphony has a duration of roughly an hour and forty minutes is divided into twelve movements:

1. Before the Creation
2. The Creation of the Cosmos
3. The Creation of Sentient Beings
4. The Creation of Human Beings
5. Joy and Love
6. Evil and Ignorance
7. Suffering
8. Compassion
9. Death
10. Judgement and Apocalypse
11. Paradise
12. Dedication

== Instrumentation ==
The symphony is scored for solo soprano, mezzo-soprano, tenor, baritone, and bass-baritone, a children's chorus, SATB choir, and a large orchestra consisting of piccolo, two flutes, two oboes, two clarinets, E♭ clarinet, bass clarinet, two bassoons, four horns, three trumpets, two trombones, bass trombone, tuba, timpani, percussion, harp, piano, and strings.

== Reception ==
Reviewing the United States premiere, Paul Griffiths of The New York Times criticized the work's repetition, writing:

Given that the symphony, in 12 movements, summarized the entirety of creation and human life, the homogeneity that was also found in the musical invention was perplexing. 'Dedication of Merit' – the last movement, a Buddhist prayer for peace to emanate from virtue – did not sound so different from 'The Creation of Sentient Beings' (the fourth movement) or, indeed, from most of the rest.

He nevertheless added:

But none of these was the moment that counted. What mattered was that right at the end, with an emphatic conclusion in sight, Mr. Glass drew back, took his music into darker, more chromatic territory, had his choir re-enter in moaning disconsolateness, and only then moved toward his close. Irony is not his strong point, but here it seemed that he was, within his own work, undercutting its preposterous pretensions.
