= Bruckner Orchestra Linz =

Austrian orchestra

The Bruckner Orchester Linz is an Austrian orchestra based in Linz. Named for Anton Bruckner, the orchestra is the concert orchestra for the state of Upper Austria, and also the opera orchestra at the Landestheater Linz (Upper Austrian State Theatre). Consisting of 110 musicians, the orchestra participates in the Bruckner Festival, the Ars Electronica Festival and the Linzer Klangwolke.

== History ==
The parent ensemble of the orchestra is the Linz Theater Orchestra. The orchestra acquired its current name in 1967, under conductor and musicologist Kurt Wöss, who subsequently served as chief conductor.

From 2002 to 2017, the orchestra's chief conductor was Dennis Russell Davies. During his tenure, the orchestra began to perform the music of Philip Glass, including the premiere of his Symphony No. 8. In February 2015, the orchestra announced the appointment of Markus Poschner as its next chief conductor, effective with the 2017–2018 season. Poschner is scheduled to conclude his tenure with the orchestra at the close of the 2026-2027 season.

Past resident conductors of the orchestra have included Ingo Ingensand. Past principal guest conductors of the orchestra have included Bruno Weil (2017–2021). In March 2021, the orchestra announced the appointment of Giedrė Šlekytė as its next principal guest conductor, the first female conductor ever named to the post, effective with the 2021–2022 season.

In May 2025, Christoph Koncz first guest-conducted the orchestra. In July 2025, the orchestra announced the appointment of Koncz as its next chief conductor, effective with the 2027-2028 season, with an initial contract of five years.

The orchestra has recorded Bruckner symphonies for such labels as Arte Nova. More recently, they have recorded several albums of the music of Philip Glass.

== Chief conductors ==
- Kurt Wöss (1967–1975)
- Theodor Guschlbauer (1975–1983)
- Roman Zeilinger (1983–1985)
- Manfred Mayrhofer (1985–1992)
- Martin Sieghart (1992–2000)
- Dennis Russell Davies (2002–2017)
- Markus Poschner (2017–present)
