= Dennis Russell Davies =

American conductor and pianist

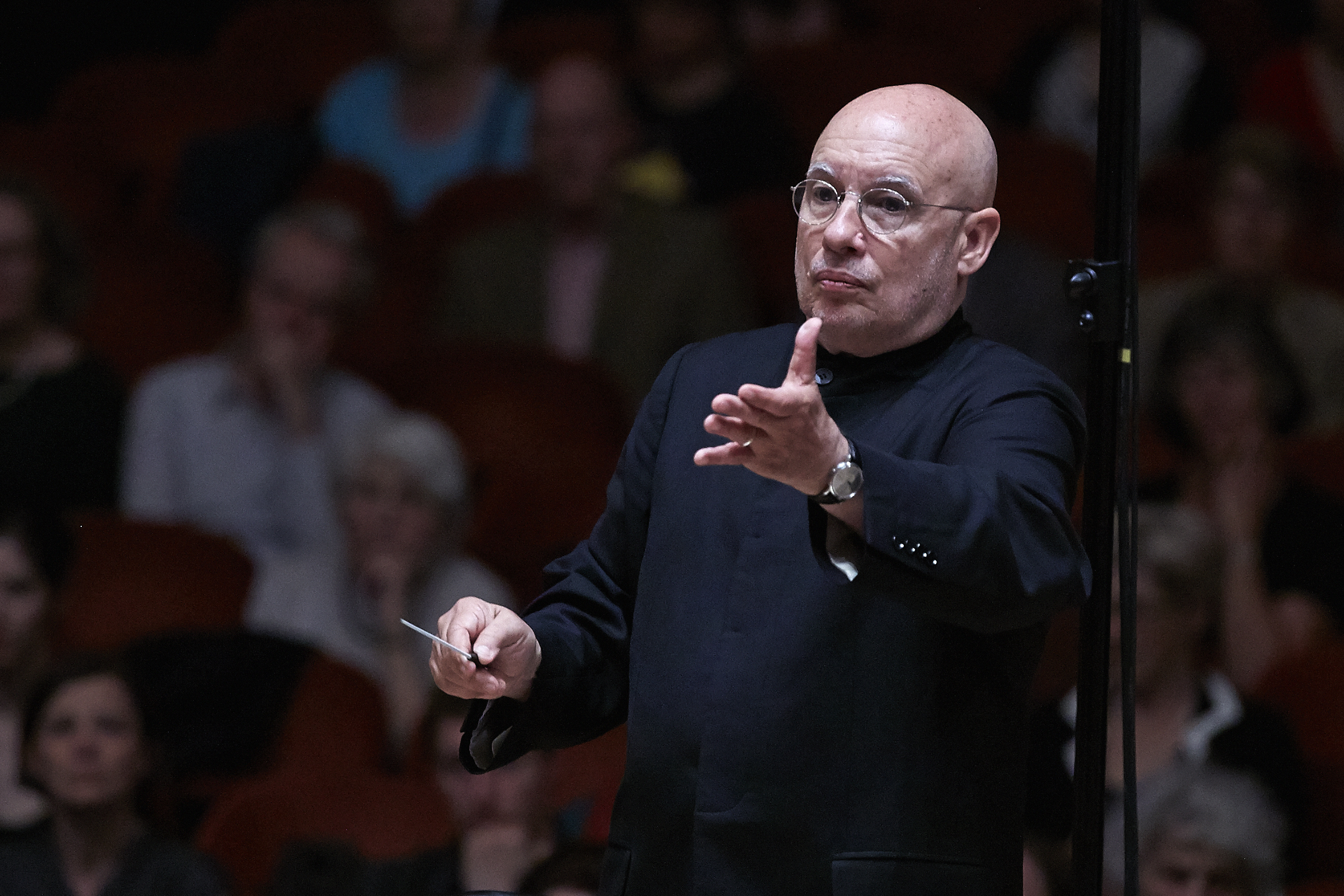
- Davies in 2013
- Born: April 16, 1944 (age 82); Toledo, Ohio, United States
- Education: Juilliard School
- Occupations: Conductor; Pianist
- Organizations: Staatsoper Stuttgart; Brno Philharmonic; MDR Leipzig Radio Symphony Orchestra

Dennis Russell Davies (born April 16, 1944) is an American conductor and pianist. He is chief conductor of the Brno Philharmonic and of the MDR Leipzig Radio Symphony Orchestra.

== Biography ==
Davies studied piano and conducting at the Juilliard School, where he received his doctorate. He was music director of the Norwalk Symphony Orchestra in Connecticut from 1969 to 1973 and the Saint Paul Chamber Orchestra from 1972 to 1980. In 1977 he co-founded the American Composers Orchestra with composer Francis Thorne, and he was its music director until 2002. Davies was music director of the Brooklyn Philharmonic from 1991 to 1996.

In 1980, Davies moved to Stuttgart, Germany, where he was general music director of the Baden-Württemberg State Opera House from 1980 to 1987. There he premiered two Philip Glass operas, along with many standard operas, often in productions with innovative and unusual staging. He has worked with many directors, including Robert Altman in a collaboration on Salome in Hamburg. He has also held permanent posts with the Stuttgart Chamber Orchestra, the Orchestra of the Beethovenhalle Bonn (1987–1995), and the Vienna Radio Symphony Orchestra. Davies was chief conductor of the Bruckner Orchestra Linz and the Linz Opera from 2002 to 2017. In March 2008, Davies was named the third music director of the Sinfonieorchester Basel, effective with the 2009–10 season, for an initial contract of five years. He held the post through the 2016–17 season. In September 2017, the Brno Philharmonic announced the appointment of Davies as its next principal conductor, effective with the 2018–2019 season, with an initial contract of four seasons. In November 2019, the MDR Leipzig Radio Symphony Orchestra announced the appointment of Dennis Russell Davies as its next chief conductor, effective with the 2020–2021 season, with an initial contract of 4 years. In April 2024, the orchestra announced an extension of Davies' contract through the 2026–2027 season.

Davies has also led many festival orchestras, including the Aspen Music Festival, the Cabrillo Festival of Contemporary Music, which he directed from 1974 to 1990, and the Saratoga Music Festival. He conducted Der fliegende Holländer at the Bayreuth Festival, the third American to conduct there, and taught orchestral conducting at the Salzburg Mozarteum.

Davies's recordings of note include Copland's Appalachian Spring with the Saint Paul Chamber Orchestra in 1979, for which he won a Grammy Award; Arvo Pärt's Fratres and Miserere; and many of Philip Glass's operas and symphonies, including the 5th symphony, which is dedicated to Davies. He premiered Glass' Symphony No. 10 at a 2012 New Year's concert in Linz. On Glass's 80th birthday, January 31, 2017, Davies premiered Glass' Symphony No. 11 at Carnegie Hall in New York. Lou Harrison's 3rd Symphony is also dedicated to Davies.

Davies has had a long-standing association with the jazz pianist Keith Jarrett. He has conducted Jarrett in classical concerto repertoire (including Mozart, Lou Harrison and Alan Hovhaness) and has himself performed Jarrett's music for piano and conducted Jarrett's orchestral music (featuring Jarrett as soloist as well as saxophonist Jan Garbarek). Davies also performs regularly in a piano duo with his wife, Maki Namekawa.

== Discography ==
=== Studio albums ===
Title	Album details	OCLC
Anton Bruckner: Symphony No. 4	Release date: October 18, 2004; Label: Arte Nova Classics	OCLC 837559084
Franz Schubert: Symphony No. 3; Symphony No. 5	Release date: September 25, 2012; Label: Sinfonieorchester Basel	OCLC 910516340

Cultural offices
Preceded by Quinto Maganini	Music Director, Norwalk Symphony Orchestra; 1969–1973	Succeeded by Gilbert Levine
Preceded by Leopold Sipe	Music Director, Saint Paul Chamber Orchestra; 1972–1980	Succeeded by Pinchas Zukerman
Preceded by Silvio Varviso	Music Director, Baden-Württemberg National Theater; 1980–1987	Succeeded by Luis Garcia Navarro
Preceded by Gustav Kuhn	Music Director, Beethovenhalle Orchestra; 1987–1995	Succeeded by Marc Soustrot
Preceded by (no predecessor)	Music Director, American Composers Orchestra; 1977–2002	Succeeded by Steven Sloane
Preceded by Martin Sieghart	Principal Conductor, Stuttgart Chamber Orchestra; 1995–2006	Succeeded by Michael Hofstetter
Preceded by Pinchas Steinberg	Principal Conductor, Vienna Radio Symphony Orchestra; 1996–2002	Succeeded by Bertrand de Billy
Preceded by Martin Sieghart	Music Director, Bruckner Orchestra Linz; 2002–2017	Succeeded by Markus Poschner
Preceded by Marko Letonja	Music Director, Sinfonieorchester Basel; 2009–2016	Succeeded by Ivor Bolton
Preceded by Aleksandar Marković	Principal Conductor, Brno Philharmonic; 2018–present	Succeeded by incumbent
Preceded by Kristjan Järvi	Chief Conductor, MDR Leipzig Radio Symphony Orchestra; 2020–present	Succeeded by incumbent
