= Ahmanson =

Ahmanson may refer to:

== People with the surname ==
- Caroline Leonetti Ahmanson (1918–2005), American fashion consultant, businesswoman and philanthropist
- Howard Ahmanson, Jr. (born 1950), American philanthropist and writer
- Howard F. Ahmanson, Sr. (1906–1968), American businessman and philanthropist
- Robert H. Ahmanson (circa 1937–2007), American businessman and philanthropist
- William H. Ahmanson (1925-2008), American chief executive, philatelist and philanthropist

== Places ==
- Ahmanson Ranch, now known as the Upper Las Virgenes Canyon Open Space Preserve
- Ahmanson Theatre, theatre in Los Angeles, California

== Other ==
- H. F. Ahmanson & Co., defunct American financial services company
- Ahmanson's sportive lemur, a lemur from Madagascar
