= Paul Jacobs (organist) =

American organist (born 1977)

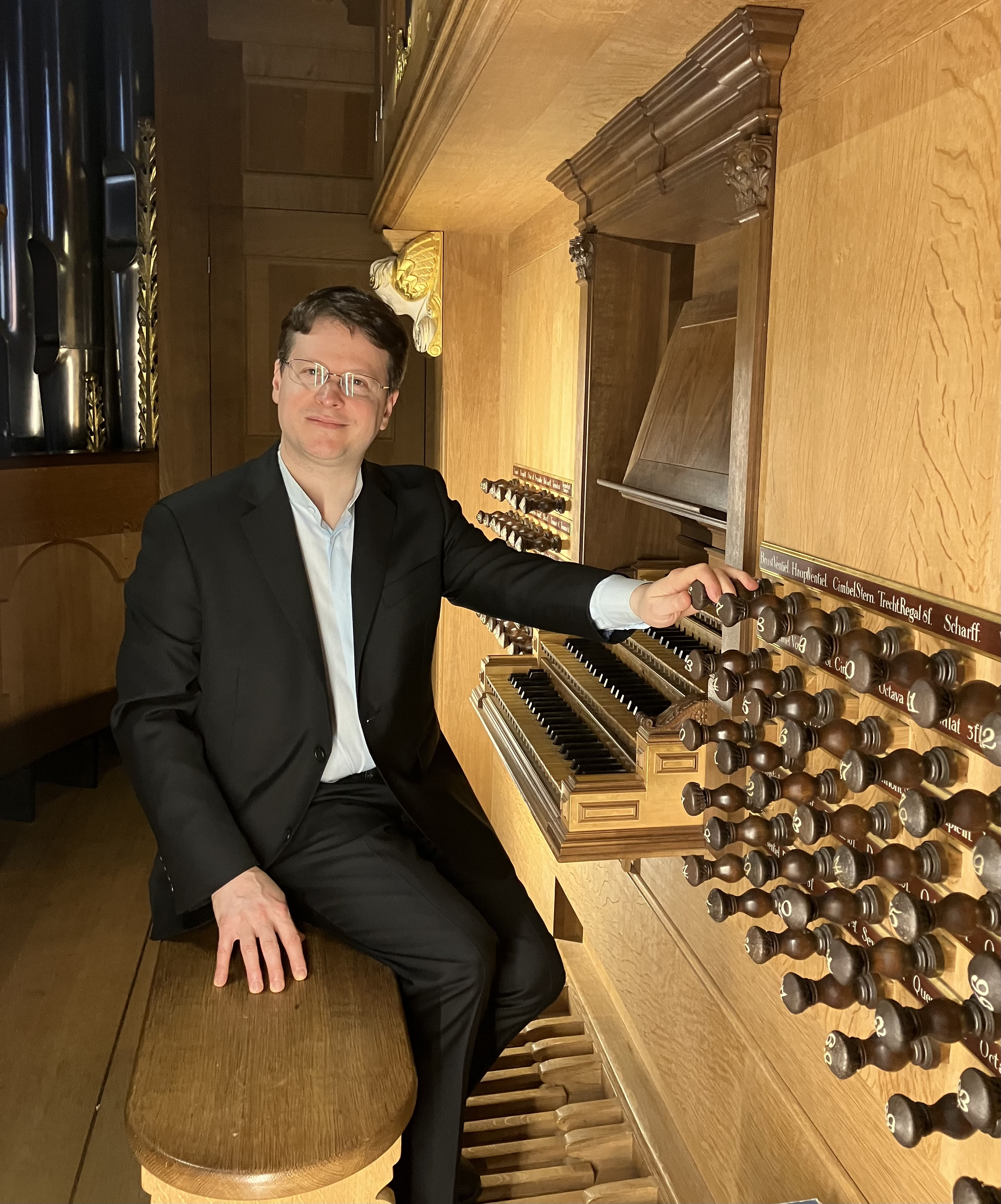
- Paul Jacobs at the Arp Schnitger organ at St. Jacobi Church in Hamburg, Germany in 2024.

Background information
- Born: 1977 (age 48–49); Washington, Pennsylvania, U.S.
- Genre: Classical music
- Occupation: Musician
- Instrument: Organ
- Labels: Naxos, JAV Recordings, Hyperion Records, SFS Media, Harmonia Mundi
- Website: pauljacobsorgan.com

Paul Jacobs (born 1977) is an American organist. He is the first organist to receive a Grammy Award. Jacobs is currently the chair of the Juilliard School's organ department and is considered "America’s premier organ performer…."

== Biography ==
Paul Jacobs began piano lessons at age five and organ lessons at age 12 in his hometown of Washington, Pennsylvania. At age 15 he was appointed head organist of Immaculate Conception Church, a parish of over 3,500 families. Jacobs then attended the Curtis Institute of Music in Philadelphia, double-majoring in organ (studying with John Weaver) and harpsichord (with Lionel Party), while serving as organist at the Washington Memorial Chapel in Valley Forge National Historical Park. During his final semester as an undergraduate student, he performed the complete organ works of Johann Sebastian Bach several times, including once in an 18-hour non-stop marathon concert in Pittsburgh on the 250th anniversary of the composer's death (July 28, 2000). Jacobs completed a master's degree from the Yale School of Music, studying organ with Thomas Murray. Jacobs has performed the complete organ works of Olivier Messiaen in eight American cities since 2002, each time in a nine-hour marathon concert.

In 2003 Jacobs was invited to join the faculty of the Juilliard School and the following year, was named chairman of its organ department, making him one of the youngest faculty appointments in the school's history. Winning accolades and awareness for the pipe organ from both critics and audiences alike, Jacobs has performed on five continents, and by the age of 32 performed in each of the 50 United States. His repertoire includes music from the 16th century through contemporary times, including new works written for him. He has appeared as soloist with the Philadelphia Orchestra, the Chicago Symphony Orchestra, the Cleveland Orchestra, the Los Angeles Philharmonic, the Pittsburgh Symphony Orchestra, the Cincinnati Symphony Orchestra, the San Francisco Symphony, the Montreal Symphony Orchestra, the Indianapolis Symphony Orchestra, the Phoenix Symphony, the Milwaukee Symphony Orchestra, the National Symphony Orchestra, the Nashville Symphony, the Kansas City Symphony, the Utah Symphony, the Minnesota Orchestra, the Edmonton Symphony, the Toledo Symphony Orchestra, the Pacific Symphony, the Warsaw Philharmonic, the NFM Wroclaw Philharmonic, and the Seattle Symphony, among others.

Jacobs has collaborated with many of the world’s leading conductors, including Gustavo Dudamel, Yannick Nezet-Seguin, Franz Welser-Moest, Pierre Boulez, Michael Tilson Thomas, Esa-Pekka Salonen, Charles Dutoit, Elim Chan, James Conlon, David Danzmayr, William Eddins, Thierry Fischer, James Gaffigan, Edward Gardner, Gustavo Gimeno, Jane Glover, Giancarlo Guerrero, Manfred Honeck, Carolyn Kuan, Lio Kuokman, Jun Märkl, Ken-David Masur, Tito Muñoz, Gemma New, David Robertson, Donald Runnicles, Daniele Rustioni, Alexander Shelley, Carl St. Clair, Michael Stern, Alain Trudel, Osmo Vänskä, Jean-Marie Zeitouni, among others.

Jacobs is known for playing demanding programs exclusively from memory. He has memorized the complete works of Olivier Messiaen, as well as the complete works of Johann Sebastian Bach, Johannes Brahms, and César Franck.

An advocate for new music, Jacobs has premiered works by Christopher Rouse, Mason Bates, Michael Daugherty, Christopher Theofanidis, Samuel Adler, John Harbison, Stephen Paulus, Wayne Oquin, and Lowell Liebermann.

Since 2014, Jacobs has served as the Director of the Oregon Bach Festival Organ Institute.

Jacobs has written several articles for The Wall Street Journal, including "The Staying Inside Guide: Pulling Out All the Stops", "The Staying Inside Guide: The Vital Sounds of Contemporary Organ", one advocating for a pipe organ to be returned to David Geffen Hall in New York City, and "Bach’s Solo Organ Spectacular." He also wrote an article for BBC Music Magazine, "The Instrument New York Doesn't Want You to Hear."

== Awards and honors ==
In addition to numerous awards and honors, Jacobs was the first organist to be given the Harvard Musical Association's Arthur W. Foote Award in 2004. He received the Yale School of Music's Distinguished Alumni Award in 2005, and in 2007 he was awarded the William Schuman Scholars Chair at the Juilliard School.

He won a Grammy Award for Best Instrumental Soloist Performance (without orchestra) at the 53rd Grammy Awards in 2011 for his recording of Messiaen: Livre Du Saint-Sacrement.

In May 2017, Jacobs was awarded an honorary Doctor of Music degree from Washington & Jefferson College.

In 2021, The American Guild of Organists named Jacobs the recipient of the International Performer of the Year Award.

== Recordings ==
- Paul Jacobs plays Bach: an unedited release (JAV 145)
- Messiaen: Livre Du Saint-Sacrement
- Ives: A Concord Symphony & Copland: Organ Symphony, San Francisco Symphony, Michael Tilson Thomas, conductor
- "American Mavericks: Lou Harrison Organ Concerto", San Francisco Symphony, Michael Tilson Thomas, conductor
- Michael Daugherty: "The Gospel According to Sister Aimee," Pacific Symphony Orchestra, Carl St. Clair, conductor
- Divine Redeemer, Christine Brewer, soprano. Released September 2015.
- Michael Daugherty: "Tales of Hemingway, American Gothic & Once upon a Castle (Live)," Nashville Symphony, Giancarlo Guerrero, conductor; Zuill Bailey, cello. Released September 2016.
- Bernd Richard Deutsch: Okeanos, Cleveland Orchestra and Franz Welser-Möst.
- Samuel Barber: Toccata Festiva, Luzerner Sinfonieorchester and James Gaffigan
- Camille Saint-Saëns, La Foi, 3 Tableaux symphoniques Op.130, Symphony n 3 in C minor Op.78, Paul Jacobs, organ, Utah Symphony, conducted by Thierry Fisher. CD Hyperion 2019
- "Organ Concertos (American): Horatio Parker, Wayne Oquin, Christopher Rouse," Nashville Symphony, Giancarlo Guerrero, conductor. Released August 2024.
