= H. F. Ahmanson =

Howard Ahmanson or H. F. Ahmanson may refer to:

- Howard F. Ahmanson Sr. (1906–1968), American businessman, entrepreneur and philanthropist
- Howard Ahmanson Jr. (born 1950), son of Howard Ahmanson Sr., philanthropist and financier
- H. F. Ahmanson & Co., bank founded by Howard F. Ahmanson Sr.
