= Home Federal =

Home Federal may refer to:

- Home Federal Bank, headquartered in Sioux Falls, South Dakota
- Home Federal Savings and Loan Association (California), S&L based in San Diego that became HomeFed Bank
- Home Federal Savings and Loan Association (North Carolina)
- Home Federal Savings and Loan Association (South Dakota), S&L based in Sioux Falls that became Home Federal Bank
