= Richard Nanes =

Richard Aberman Nanes (December 11, 1927 – October 8, 2009) was an American businessman, and composer and pianist.

== Life ==
Richard Aberman Nanes was born on December 11, 1927, in Philadelphia. Several sources give Nanes' year of birth as 1941. A New York Times article makes him 44 in 1983, which implies a 1938 or 1939 birth. However, his induction into the Hall of Fame at Nutley Library states that he graduated from Nutley High School in 1946, which puts his birth year at 1927 or 1928.

Nanes died of cancer on October 8, 2009.

== Business ==
Nanes was executive president and co-owner of Nanes Finishing and Assembly Corporation, a Newark, New Jersey, company founded by his father in 1956. The company at some point moved into the computer frame industry.

== Music ==
In the 1970s he became active as a composer. He was sometime composer in residence at Cathedral Basilica of the Sacred Heart.

His works include:

- Symphony No. 1 in B flat major "Atlantis - The Sunken City"
- Symphony No. 2 in B major "The False Benediction"
- Symphony No. 3 "The Holocaust"
- Symphony No. 4 "The Eternal Conflict"
- Numerous piano pieces including a set of six nocturnes entitled "Nocturnes of the Celestial Seas"
- Various concertante works for piano or violin, including a Rhapsody Pathétique for Violin and Orchestra
- Five string quartets

In 1985 his Symphony for Strings was given its by the Pacific Symphony in what the Los Angeles Times music critic Chris Pasles described as an "easy-to-take premiere". The 1st and 2nd Symphonies were recorded by the London Philharmonic Orchestra under Pacific Symphony founder Keith Clark in 1986. Both concerts were filmed and recorded by the Eternal Word Television Network. The full cycle of four symphonies was re-recorded by the LPO under Thomas Sanderling and released in 1994. These recordings were all issued by the "Delfon Recording Society". Although the financial relationship between Nanes and Delfon has not been made public, Delfon's entire discography consists of works by Nanes. Delfon issued a digital re-release of Nocturnes in 2003, again with Nanes himself at the piano.

Bernard Holland in The New York Times was harshly critical of Nanes' "extremely simple" piano works, and described the 1st Symphony as "a busy piece". Blogger Jeffrey Quick labelled the symphonies "ugly" and "inept" and Allan Kozinn panned the 3rd as "horrifying without being evocative. It lurched about clunkily, with dissonant power chords punctuating stretches of Debussy-like shimmer and brass chorales, mistaking ugliness for portent."
