= Cayuga Chamber Orchestra =

The Cayuga Chamber Orchestra, founded in 1976, is based in Ithaca, New York. Each season includes an Orchestral Series, a Chamber Music Series, and special holiday and educational programs.

== History ==
The Cayuga Chamber Orchestra, formally designated as the "Official Orchestra of the City of Ithaca," has been bringing a wide variety of classical music to audiences of all ages for over three decades.

The orchestra was founded by Charles E.L. McCary in May 1976 when a group of local professional musicians debuted as the Finger Lakes Orchestra. Distinguished conductor and Pulitzer Prize winning composer Karel Husa, became music director of the orchestra in 1977 and served until 1984. He led the CCO in over 50 performances including ballet, oratorios, commissioned works, premieres, and many of his own works. During an interim period from 1984 to 1986, the CCO was led by guest conductors while the organization searched for a new musical leader. In March 1986, the board of directors appointed Carl St.Clair Music Director. Under the leadership of Mr. St.Clair, the CCO expanded its offerings from six to ten concerts per season. In 1987-88 the Chamber Music Series was added, and in December 1988, a new holiday event, Caroling by Candlelight, was introduced. Mr. St.Clair stepped down as music director in 1991 but continued as artistic advisor while the search for his successor was undertaken.

During 1992–93, six finalists led full-orchestra concerts, and in May 1993, Heiichiro Ohyama became the CCO's third music director.

Maestro Kimbo Ishii-Eto was the next music director for the CCO, and helped lead the milestone celebrations of the CCO's 25th season, and the 30th anniversary season in 2006–2007. Ishii-Eto was instrumental in working with several local groups and artists in collaborative performances, including highly distinguished artists such as Steven Stucky, Rachel Lampert, Steven Doane, and the Cayuga Vocal Ensemble. Ishii-Eto's final performance as music director for the CCO was in April 2007, when he conducted Beethoven's Ninth Symphony at Bailey Hall with the Cornell University Chorus and Glee Club.

On April 19, 2008, the CCO announced that Lanfranco Marcelletti would be taking the podium for the 08-09 Season as the next CCO Music Director. Among the notable accomplishments and collaborations during his tenure, is the release of a commercial CD of music by American composer Charles Bestor. Upon the announcement of his departure from the CCO so that he could focus on his position with the Xalapa Symphony Orchestra, Marcelletti said, "These past six years were the most memorable years for me with any music ensemble. The CCO is, as I always say and insist, a hidden jewel and every time I stand in front of my fellow musicians, I feel the same excitement and admiration I felt in my very first rehearsal in March of 2008." Since 2016, the music director is Cornelia Laemmli Orth.

== Education Programs ==
In recognition of the Cayuga Chamber Orchestra's continuing commitment to music in education and community engagement, the CCO's long-standing Willard Daetsch Youth Outreach Program was a recipient of a 2015 Yale Distinguished Music Education Partnership Award. Each year, the program introduces the instruments and classical music to hundreds of second grade students.

== Recordings ==
- Bestor: The Long Goodbye
