= Symphony No. 13 (Glass) =

2022 symphony composed by Philip Glass

- by Philip Glass
- The album cover of Truth in Our Time
- Period: Contemporary
- Style: Postmodern, minimalist
- Form: Symphony
- Composed: 2020
- Duration: 20 minutes

Premiere
- Date: March 20, 2022
- Location: Roy Thomson Hall, Toronto
- Conductor: Alexander Shelley
- Performers: National Arts Centre Orchestra

Symphony No. 13 (Truth in Our Time) is the thirteenth symphony written by American composer Philip Glass. It was commissioned by the National Arts Centre Orchestra as a tribute to Canadian-American journalist Peter Jennings. The work was premiered by the orchestra under conductor Alexander Shelley on March 20th, 2022 at Roy Thomson Hall in Toronto.

The piece is in 3 movements. Movement I has a sonata-like form and lasts approximately 8 minutes, Movement II lasts approximately 6 minutes, and Movement III uses a quintuple meter and a coda and lasts approximately 7 minutes.

== History ==
The idea for the Symphony was first envisioned by Jennings' children, as a multimedia musical work, during a visit to their aunt Sarah in Ottawa. Their aunt had heard that the National Arts Centre Orchestra were looking to commission a new piece by an international composer. She gave her support without choosing the composer; in 2019, the orchestra ending up choosing Philip Glass, who had been awarded the Glenn Gould Prize in Ottawa in 2016. Glass composed the piece over the summer of 2020:

"I was very impressed by the NAC Orchestra when receiving the Glenn Gould Prize, and was excited to receive this commission from them to honour the person, work and ethos of Peter Jennings, on a theme which is very close to my heart," Glass in 2019.

=== Premiere ===
External videos
- The Symphony's Premiere at Southam Hall

The piece's world premiere was on March 20, 2022, 8 PM, at Roy Thomson Hall, Toronto; it was performed with Shostakovich's 9th and Korngold’s Violin Concerto. The work debuted in the United States, alongside a performance of Yurii Shevchenko's We Do Exist, at Carnegie Hall, Manhattan, New York City on April 5, 2022, at 8 PM. The piece completed its premiere tour with two performances on April 13 and April 14, 2022, in Southam Hall, Ottawa.

== Instrumentation ==
The piece was orchestrated for: two flutes (the second player doubling the piccolo) two oboes, two clarinets in B♭ (the second doubling the bass clarinet) two bassoons, four horns in F, three trumpets in C, two trombones, bass trombone, tuba, timpani, two percussion players (using the triangle, tambourine, suspended cymbal, tam-tam, woodblock, three bongos, snare drum, tenor drum, and bass drum), harp, and string orchestra.

== Recordings ==
Conductor	Orchestra	Recording Date	Formats	Labels	Catalogue ID	References
Alexander Shelley	National Arts Centre Orchestra	2022, released 2024	CD / Digital	Orange Mountain Music	OMM0166	
