= Terry Mattingly =

American journalist and writer

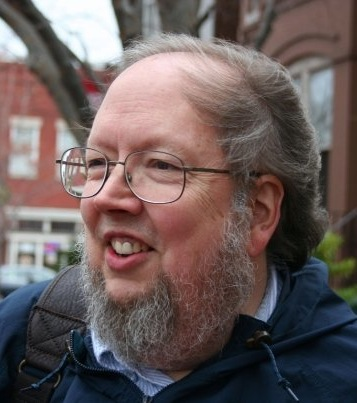
- Mattingly in 2008
- Born: January 31, 1954 (age 72)
- Education: Baylor University(BA, MA); University of Illinois at Urbana–Champaign (MS)
- Occupation: Columnist
- Political party: American Solidarity
- Website: www.tmatt.net

Terry L. "TMatt" Mattingly (born January 31, 1954) is a journalist, author, and professor. He has written "On Religion", a nationally syndicated column, since the summer of 1988. Mattingly also ran a well-known religious journalism blog, GetReligion, from 2004 to 2024.

Mattingly was Director of The Washington Journalism Center, a program run by the Council for Christian Colleges and Universities. He is currently a senior fellow at the Overby Center for Southern Journalism & Politics at the University of Mississippi.

== Early life and education ==
Mattingly was raised by a father who was a Southern Baptist pastor. He was involved in Boy Scouts as a youth. Mattingly graduated from Thomas Jefferson High School in Port Arthur, Texas. He then attended Baylor University, where he graduated with a B.A. in journalism and American history in 1976. He then obtained an M.S. in journalism in 1982 from the University of Illinois Urbana-Champaign and a M.A. in church-state studies from Baylor University in 1984.

== Career ==
Mattingly's first major journalism job with the Champaign-Urbana News-Gazette. As a staff writer and copy editor, he wrote Backbeat, a rock 'n' roll column. While writing Backbeat, one of Mattingly's subjects included a 1982 tour by U2.

From 1982-1984, Mattingly worked for The Charlotte News and later The Charlotte Observer, and from 1984–1990, he was a religion writer for the Rocky Mountain News in Denver. He taught at Milligan College.

Mattingly began in 1988 as a religion columnist for On Religion at the Scripps Howard News Service in Washington, D.C., now part of Andrews McMeel Syndication. Mattingly founded a religious journalism blog, GetReligion, in 2004.

As the founder of the Washington Journalism Center, Mattingly taught journalism to students in Washington, D.C. Mattingly has a long association with Howard Ahmanson Jr. and his wife, Roberta, dating back to Roberta's tenure as a religion reporter for The Orange County Register in the late 1980s. Roberta was an original financial backer of GetReligion and Ahmanson has funded the Washington Journalism Center and the Oxford Centre for Religion and Public Life, which currently hosts the website.

Mattingly's first book, released in 2005, was Pop Goes Religion: Faith in Popular Culture.

Mattingly announced the shutdown of new GetReligion coverage in February 2024.

== Personal life ==
After leaving the Southern Baptist Convention, the Christian body in which he was raised, Mattingly was for a time a member of Episcopal Church. He often refers to himself as a prodigal Texan. He is a practicing Orthodox Christian, a member of the Antiochian Orthodox Christian Archdiocese of North America.

Mattingly is a supporter of the American Solidarity Party.
