= Carl St.Clair =

American conductor (born 1952)

Carl Ray St.Clair (born June 5, 1952) is an American conductor.

== Biography ==
Born in Hochheim, Texas, St.Clair went to school in Yoakum, Texas, and graduated from Yoakum High School. He attended the University of Texas and later studied conducting with Gustav Meier at the University of Michigan and Leonard Bernstein at Tanglewood. He was music director of the Ann Arbor Symphony Orchestra (Michigan) from 1985 to 1992, and of the Cayuga Chamber Orchestra (Ithaca, New York) from 1986 to 1991. Beginning in 1986, he was an assistant conductor with the Boston Symphony Orchestra. In 1990, he was a recipient of the Seaver/National Endowment for the Arts Conductors Award.

In January 1990, St.Clair guest-conducted the Pacific Symphony for the first time. St.Clair became the music director of the Pacific Symphony as of the 1990–1991 season. During his Pacific Symphony tenure, he and the orchestra have commissioned and recorded several works, including Richard Danielpour's An American Requiem (Reference Recordings) and Elliot Goldenthal's Fire Water Paper: A Vietnam Oratorio (Sony Classical) with cellist Yo-Yo Ma. Other recordings include "Radiant Voices" and "Postcard" by composer in residence Frank Ticheli (Koch International Classics), and the two piano concertos of Lukas Foss (harmonia mundi). The orchestra and St.Clair host an annual festival of American composers, including "Uncharted Beauty: The Music of Lou Harrison" (2005–2006), "Los Sonidos de México" (2006–2007), and "The West — Music inspired by the American Frontier" (2007–2008). St.Clair stood down from the Pacific Symphony post in 2025 and now has the title of music director laureate for life with the orchestra.

In Europe, St.Clair was principal guest conductor of the Radio-Sinfonieorchester Stuttgart from 1998 to 2004, where his work included a three-year recording project of the Villa–Lobos symphonies. He became Generalmusikdirektor (General Music Director, or GMD) of the Staatskapelle Weimar in 2005, a post he held for three years. In 2008, he took up the post of GMD of the Komische Oper Berlin, with an initial contract of six years. However, in May 2010, he resigned effective with the end of the 2009–2010 season.

In 2014, St.Clair became principal conductor of the Orquesta Sinfónica Nacional de Costa Rica. He held the Costa Rica post until 2023 and now has the title of conductor emeritus of the orchestra, since 2025.

St.Clair first guest-conducted the Thailand Philharmonic Orchestra in 2019. In September 2025, the Thailand Philharmonic announced the appointment of St.Clair as its new music director.

St.Clair has served on the faculties of Southern Illinois University Edwardsville, the University of Michigan, and the University of Southern California. He has worked on the creation and implementation of various symphony education programs, including "Classical Connections", "arts-X–press" and "Class Act". In 2006, he worked with the German Bundesjugendorchester (National Youth Orchestra). In 2012, St.Clair was appointed principal conductor and artistic leader of the Thornton Symphony Orchestra at the University of Southern California's Thornton School of Music.

In 2025 St.Clair was recognized as "the longest-tenured American-born conductor of a major American orchestra" for his position with the Pacific Symphony.

== Personal life ==
Carl St.Clair and his wife, Susan, have two children. In July 1999, their first child, Cole, passed away. In 2001, the arts-x-press Arts Immersion Program which is an arts summer camp for middle school students, was created in Cole's memory.

Cultural offices
Preceded by Keith Clark	Music Director, Pacific Symphony; 1990–2025	Succeeded by Alexander Shelley
Preceded by Jac van Steen	Generalmusikdirektor, Staatskapelle Weimar; 2005–2008	Succeeded by Stefan Solyom
Preceded by Kirill Petrenko	Generalmusikdirektor, Komische Oper Berlin; 2008–2010	Succeeded by Patrick Lange
Preceded by Daniel Nazareth	Principal Conductor, Orquesta Sinfónica Nacional de Costa Rica; 2014–2023	Succeeded by Andrés Salado
Preceded by Alfonso Scarano (chief conductor)	Music Director, Thailand Philharmonic Orchestra; 2025–present	Succeeded by incumbent
