= Howard Ahmanson Jr. =

American Evangelical philanthropist (born 1950)

Howard F. Ahmanson Jr.
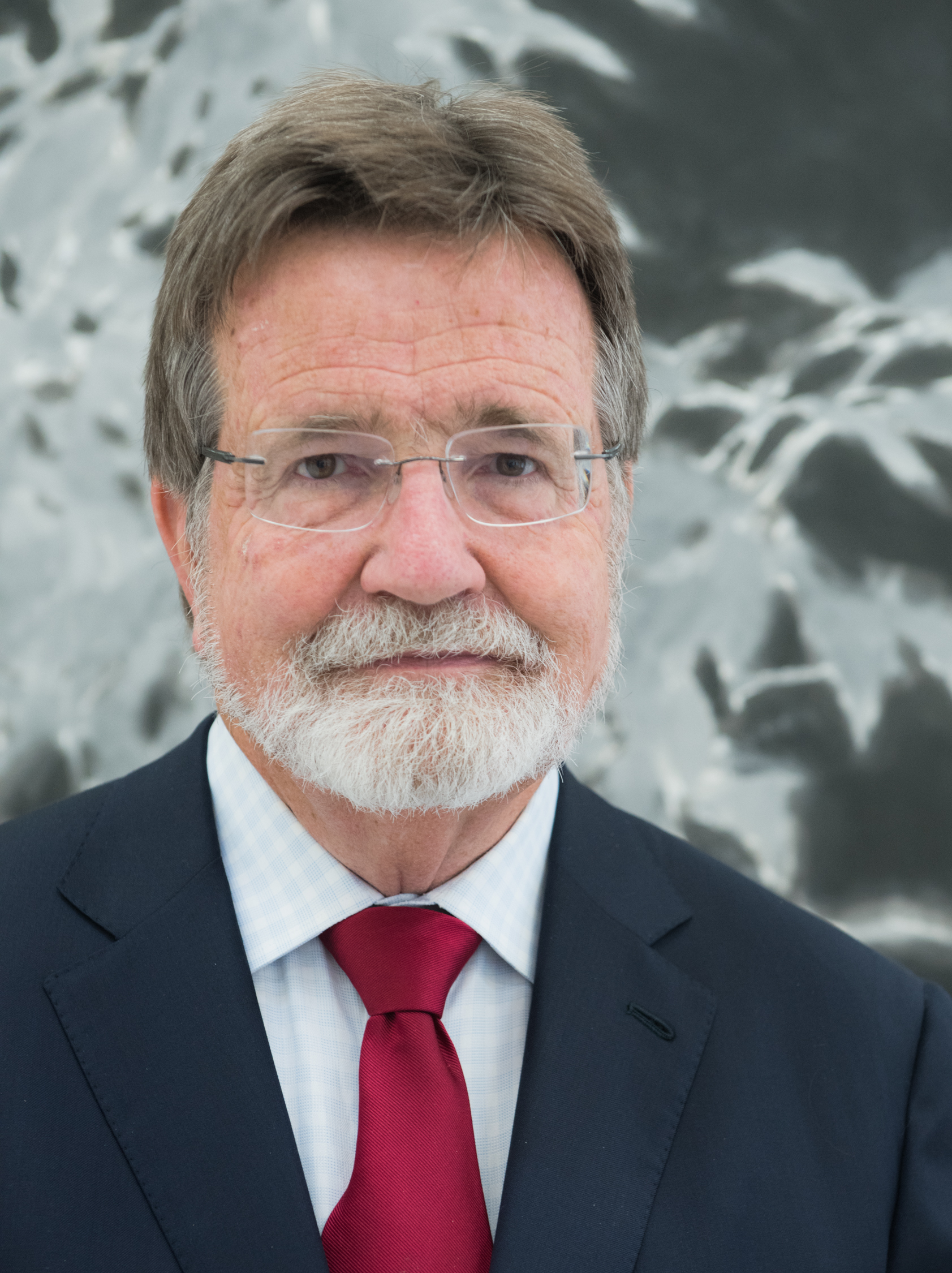
- Ahmanson in 2016
- Born: Howard Fieldstad Ahmanson Jr. February 3, 1950 (age 76); Los Angeles, California, U.S.
- Education: Occidental College (BA); University of Texas at Arlington (MA)
- Occupation: Philanthropist
- Spouse: Roberta Green Ahmanson (m. 1986)
- Children: David Ahmanson
- Parent(s): Howard F. Ahmanson Sr. Dorothy Johnston Grannis
- Relatives: Caroline Leonetti Ahmanson (stepmother); Robert H. Ahmanson (cousin); William H. Ahmanson (cousin)

Howard Fieldstad Ahmanson Jr. (born February 3, 1950) is an American Evangelical philanthropist. He is the son of Howard F. Ahmanson Sr., the founder of Home Savings Bank.

== Early life and education ==
Howard Fieldstad Ahmanson Jr. was born on February 3, 1950. He is the son of Dorothy Johnston Grannis and financier Howard F. Ahmanson Sr. (1906–1968). His father was a prominent businessman in the savings and loan industry; Howard Sr. founded H. F. Ahmanson & Co., which thrived in the Great Depression and ultimately expanded throughout California and into New York state, Arizona and Florida. His father was well known for his support of the arts, an area in which Ahmanson has continued to be active.

His parents divorced when he was ten years old. Despite the trappings of wealth, Howard Jr. was a lonely child. He has said, "I resented my family background, [my father] could never be a role model, whether by habits or his lifestyle, it was never anything I wanted." His father died when he was eighteen, and Ahmanson inherited the family's fortune.

He attended Occidental College, where he obtained a degree in economics. He then toured Europe, but returned because of complications with arthritis. He earned a master's degree in linguistics at the University of Texas at Arlington.

== Monetary contributions ==
=== Organizations and projects ===
Fieldstead and Company, Howard and Roberta Ahmanson's personal office, has a steady history of contributing parts of his father's inherited fortune to a plethora of organizations and initiatives. It is stated that the mission of Fieldstead and Company is to "make the world more like ... a place where there is no darkness, no sickness, no hunger or thirst, no slavery, no prisoners, no tears, no death". The following is a list of organizations to which the Ahmansons have contributed significant amounts in the past:

- American Anglican Council; Washington, D.C.

→Association of orthodox Episcopal churches, led by Rev. Canon David Anderson.

- Biola University; La Mirada, California
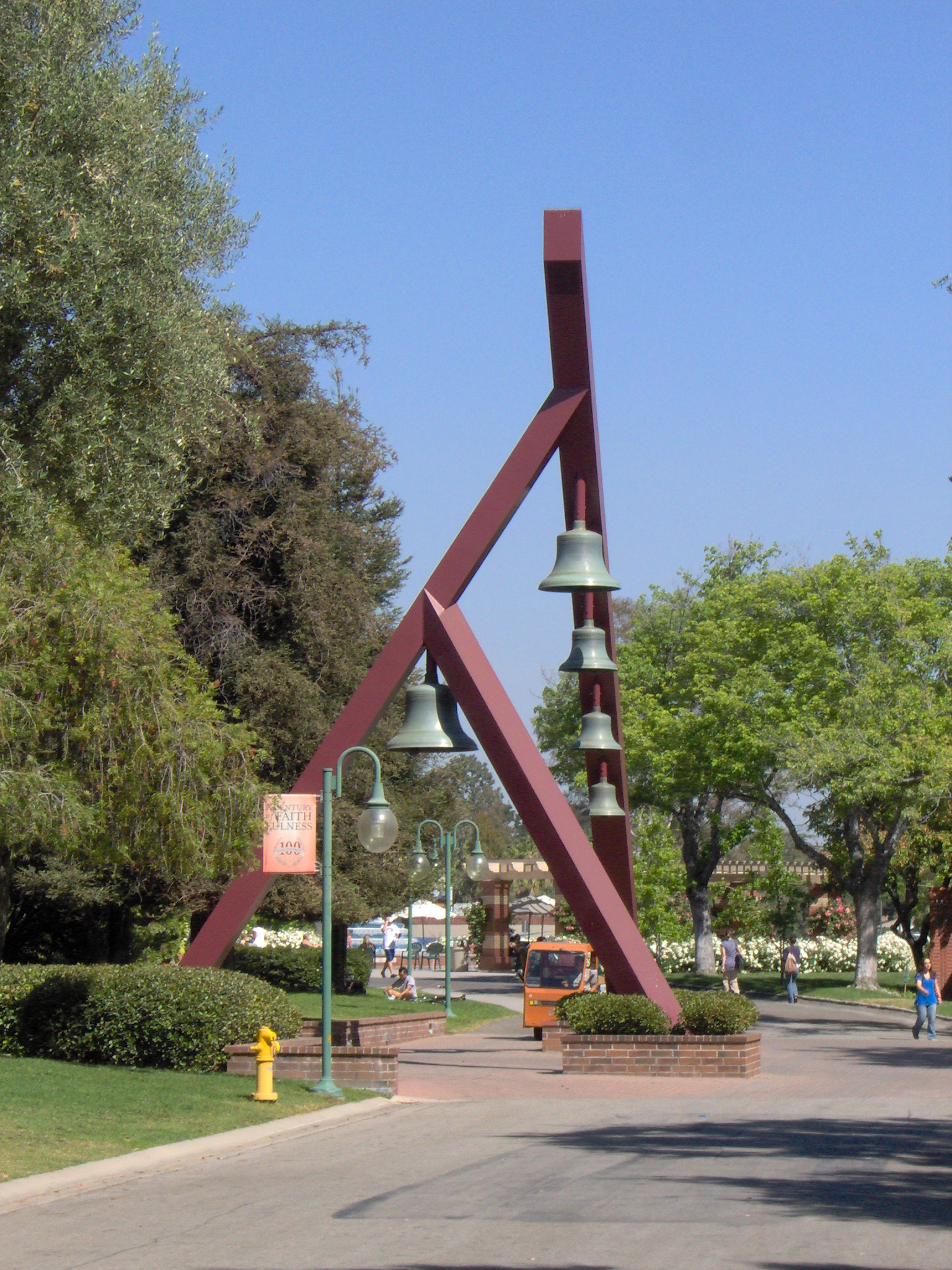
  Biola University, one of many entities that has received contributions from Ahmanson
- California Policy Center; Tustin, California
- Calvin College; Grand Rapids, Michigan

→Roberta Ahmanson graduated from Calvin College in 1972.

- Chalcedon Foundation; Vallecito, California
- Chapman University; Orange, California

→By way of Fieldstead & Company, Ahmanson sponsors series of conferences and events predominantly focused on matters such as housing policy and urbanism, all held at Chapman University's Wilkinson College for Arts, Humanities, and Social Sciences.

- Claremont Institute; Claremont, California

→Think tank seeking "to restore the principles of the American Founding to their rightful, preeminent authority in our national life."

- Discovery Institute; Seattle, Washington

→Howard Ahmanson Jr. served on the board of directors for the Center for Science and Culture, a proponent for the intelligent design movement.

- Drew University; Madison, New Jersey

→Founders of a team that published 28 volumes of the "Ancient Christian Commentary on Scripture."

- Ethics and Public Policy Center (EPPC); Washington D.C.

→Think tank that view domestic and foreign policy issues from a Judeo-Christian point of view.

- Food for the Hungry; Phoenix, Arizona

→Evangelical-based relief organization with annual budget of about $76 million and programs in 37 countries in the developing world.

- Fullhart-Carnegie Museum Trust; Perry, Iowa

→The contribution funds a museum in the town of Perry, Iowa, in which Roberta Ahmanson grew up.

- Hudson Institute; Washington, D.C.
- International Fellowship for Mission as Transformation (INFEMIT USA); Washington, D.C.
- InterVarsity Christian Fellowship; Madison, Wisconsin
- John & Vera Mae Perkins Foundation
- Maranatha Trust; Washington, D.C.
- Mariners Christian School; Costa Mesa, California

→Private school in Costa Mesa with about 650 students in preschool to eighth grade.

- National Coalition for the Protection of Children and Families (formerly National Coalition Against Pornography); Cincinnati, Ohio.
- Orange County Classical Academy; Orange, California

→A K-12 Classical Education public charter school.

- Orange County Rescue Mission; Santa Ana, California

→The Orange County Rescue Mission provides housing, support, and treatment, for people struggling with poverty and drug addiction.

- Pepperdine University; Malibu, California

→Similar to his programs at Chapman University, Ahmanson sponsors events and conferences on the topics of urbanism and affordable housing at Pepperdine's School of Public Policy.

- St. James Anglican Church; Newport Beach, California

→Formerly "St. James Episcopal Church", the Ahmansons have attended the "evangelical church with charismatic roots."

- CityGate (Formerly "Sen USA"); Hobart, Indiana

→Evangelical Christian missionary group working in Central and Eastern Europe.

- Strong Towns; Brainerd, Minnesota

→Ahmanson has made several contributions to Strong Towns, a think tank and community that encourages Americans and Canadians, alike, to rethink the way municipal infrastructure is developed and sustained in their respective communities.

- Voice of OC; Santa Ana, California

→Fieldstead & Company has supported Voice of OC, a startup nonprofit newsroom founded by Norberto Santana Jr. to cover events in Orange County.

- World Vision; Washington, D.C.

Howard has previously served as a board member for both the John & Vera Mae Perkins Foundation and the Claremont Institute. Ahmanson is a major supporter of the Discovery Institute, whose Center for Science and Culture supports ideas centered around intelligent design. Through Fieldstead, Ahmanson's wife Roberta, a former religion reporter and editor for the Orange County Register, has funded and been directly involved with some programs of the Council for Christian Colleges and Universities, including the Washington Journalism Center that encompasses both the Summer Institute of Journalism, and the Fieldstead Journalism Lectures. Fieldstead has funded other Christian journalistic projects such as Gegrapha and GetReligion. A common thread in all of these organizations is Terry Mattingly, a personal friend of Roberta Ahmanson, who directs the Washington Journalism Center at the Council for Christian Colleges and Universities, teaches journalism, and writes a weekly column for the Scripps-Howard News Service. Roberta Ahmanson recently co-edited a book called Blind Spot. Howard and Roberta are also supporters of The Media Project, an organization that "educates journalists on the importance of religion" and its digital magazine, Religion Unplugged. The Ahmansons have also supported the creation of the 29-volume Ancient Christian Commentary on Scripture, published by InterVarsity Press.

=== Social advocacy and political involvement ===
Ahmanson was a major advocate for the abolition of California redevelopment agencies, especially concerned about what he viewed as the widespread abuse of eminent domain and public subsidies. He financed the publication "Redevelopment: The Unknown Government" and the formation of Municipal Officials for Redevelopment Reform (MORR), alongside Chris Norby, California legislator and former mayor of Fullerton, California, in 1995. Norby later served in the California State Assembly when redevelopment agencies were abolished in 2011 and MORR was disbanded, having succeeded in its sole purpose.

Ahmanson was a registered Republican until 2008; Ahmanson, worried about the narrowing focus of the California Republican Party on lowering taxes, announced that he switched parties and was a registered Democrat from 2008 to 2018. Finding fault with both parties, he is now officially registered as a "No Party Preference" (NPP) voter (formerly referred to as a decline-to-state voter by the state of California). In the 2020 presidential election, Ahmanson voted for and endorsed Brian T. Carroll of the American Solidarity Party.

Time magazine included the Ahmansons in their 2005 profiles of the 25 Most Influential Evangelicals in America, classifying them as "the financiers." In the 1970s, Howard became a board member of the Chalcedon Foundation and served until 1996. In 1996, he said he had left the Chalcedon board due to the fact that he "did not embrace" all of the teachings held by its leadership.

In 2004, the Orange County Register wrote a five-part profile of the Ahmansons.

Holding a strong interest and passion in the activity of standup paddleboarding, Ahmanson has assumed a role of activism alongside FreeSUP SoCal in opposition to a particular determination made by the United States Coast Guard (USCG) that has been used to require operators of standup paddleboards to wear a personal flotation device (PFD). FreeSUP SoCal maintains that a leash is the more common and frequently most effective safety equipment, as evidenced by its widespread usage and the sport's significantly diminished mortality rate compared to other water sports. In 2014, the organization that would come to be known as FreeSup SoCal and which receives funding by Ahmanson, offered a formal, public comment to the USCG that explained how the PFD determination which was intended to promote safety for standup paddleboarders sorely lacked data justifying the determination, and that making determinations without the necessary data could have the opposite effect of putting paddleboarders in peril.

== Arts and humanities ==
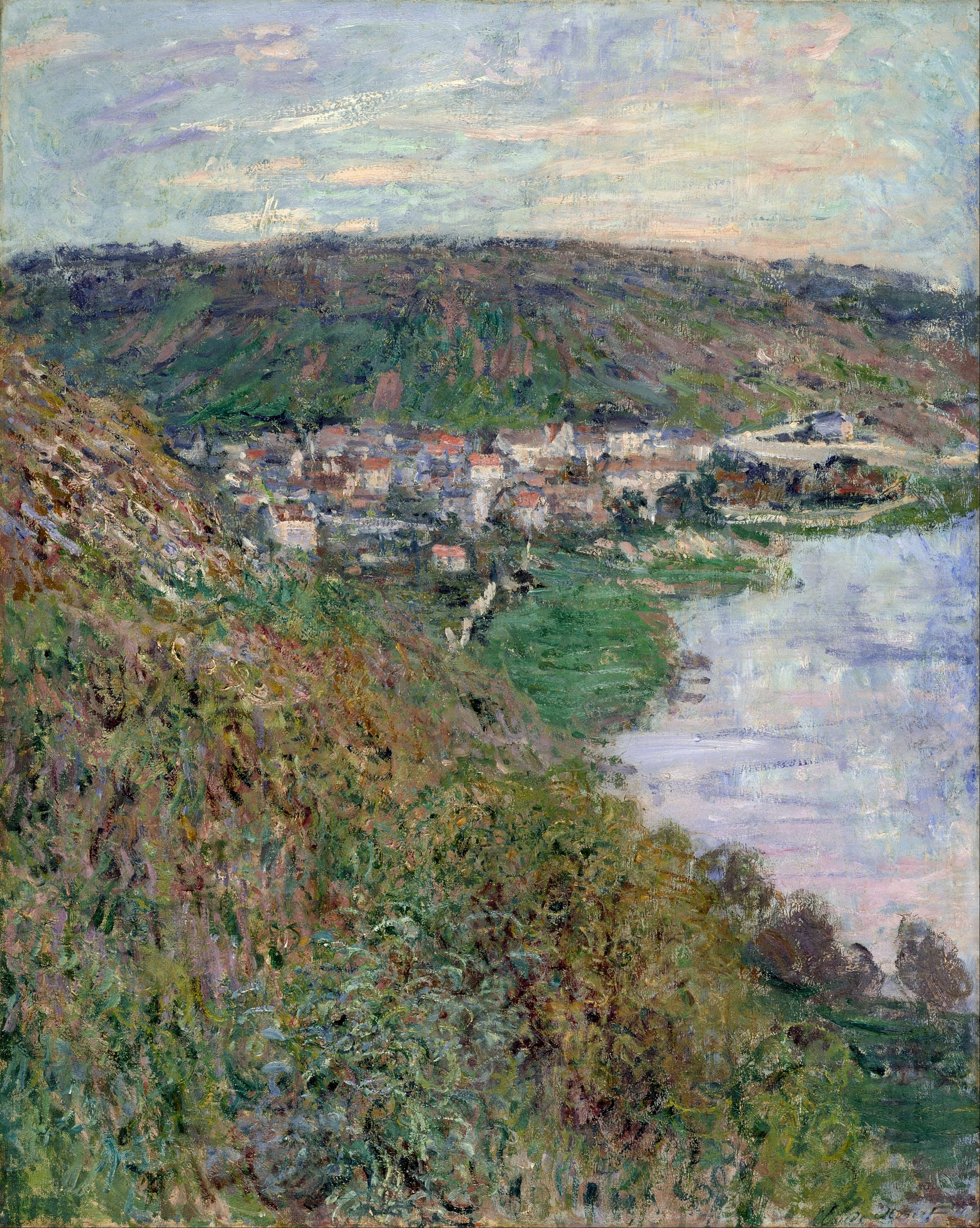
Claude Monet "View of Vétheuil", Owned by Ahmanson before he donated to LACMA

=== Organizations ===
Ahmanson has made numerous contributions and offered support for art initiatives across Los Angeles and Orange County. The following is a collection of organizations and projects in the arts & humanities that have benefited from his support:

- Bridge Projects
- Stanley Spenser: An English Vision installment at the Hirshhorn Museum, Washington, D.C.
- The Sacred Made Real
- Visual Commentary on Scripture (VCS)
- Caravaggio: The Final Years at the National Gallery, London
- Pacific Symphony Youth Orchestra
- Ancient Christian Commentary on Scripture, published by InterVarsity Press
- The Palace of Fine Arts in San Francisco
- The Museum of Contemporary Art in Mexico City

=== Bridge Projects ===
Bridge Projects is an LA-based art gallery that consists of a community of artists, scholars, and collectors who are inspired by art history, spirituality, living religious traditions, and contemporary art practices. Roberta, wife of Ahmanson and current chair of Bridge Projects, founded the gallery and community with LA-based artist, Linnea Spransy, back in 2017. While Howard played a supportive role in bringing this project to fruition, Roberta spearheaded the vision for Bridge Projects, which has featured a number of progressive art installations, such as:

- "10 Columns," an immersive light installation created by prominent Southern California artist, Phillip K. Smith III(active:10/12/19-2/16/20).
- "A Composite Leviathan," a two-part exhibition created by a collection of emerging Chinese artists (active: 9/12/20-2/27/21).
- "To Bough and To Bend," an exhibition of many artists using trees as imagery for discussions around ecological issues (active: 03/11/20-07.25/20).

== Personal life ==
In 1986, Ahmanson married journalist Roberta Green.

Ahmanson lives with Tourette syndrome. His primary residence is in Newport Beach, California.
