= Caroline Leonetti Ahmanson =

American businesswoman and philanthropist

- Born: Caroline Leonetti; April 12, 1918; San Francisco, California, US
- Died: June 21, 2005 (aged 87); Beverly Hills, California, US
- Education: University of California, Berkeley; California School of Design
- Occupation(s): Businesswoman, philanthropist
- Spouse(s): Bernhardt Paul Heim; Howard F. Ahmanson Sr.
- Children: 1
- Relatives: Howard Ahmanson Jr. (stepson); Robert H. Ahmanson(nephew)

Caroline Leonetti Ahmanson (April 12, 1918 – June 21, 2005) was an American fashion consultant, businesswoman and philanthropist. She was a corporate director of The Walt Disney Company and the Fluor Corporation. She served as Chairman of the Federal Reserve Bank of San Francisco from 1981 to 1984. She founded the Los Angeles County High School for the Arts and was a trustee of the Los Angeles County Museum of Art.

== Early life ==
Caroline Leonetti was born on April 12, 1918, in San Francisco, California. She graduated from the University of California, Berkeley in Berkeley, California and the California School of Design in San Francisco.

== Career ==
Ahmanson started her career as a fashion consultant on the radio and in television, including Art Linkletter's program. In 1945, she founded Caroline Leonetti Ltd., a modeling agency in Los Angeles. It was purchased by Raphael Berko in 1987 and renamed Media Artists Group.

From 1981 to 1984, she served as Chairman of the Federal Reserve Bank of San Francisco.

She served on the Boards of Directors of The Walt Disney Company (NYSE: DIS), the Fluor Corporation (NYSE: FLR) and Carter Hawley Hale Stores (later known as Broadway Stores). She also served on the City of Los Angeles Economic Advisory Council. Additionally, she served as Senior Vice Chairman of the Los Angeles Area Chamber of Commerce.

== Philanthropy ==
Ahmanson served on the National Advisory Council of the Peace Corps. She was appointed by President Richard Nixon to serve on the National Committee on United States–China Relations, and was Vice Chairman. In this capacity, she helped the Chinese government better understand about caring for the disabled. A dinner conversation she had with Deng Pufang, Deng Xiaoping's son, led to a research trip sponsored by the National Committee and a meeting between Deng and President Ronald Reagan (when he was President) in the White House to talk about better treatment of the disabled. She was a co-founder of the Los Angeles-Guangzhou Sister City Committee, serving as its Chairman; she and appointed Katrina Leung as its President.

Later, she was appointed by President Reagan to serve on the President's Committee on the Arts and Humanities. She was also appointed to the National Council on the Humanities and the California Arts Commission. She then served on the President's Council of the Richard Nixon Presidential Library and Museum in Yorba Linda, California.

She became the first female member of the Rotary Club of Los Angeles in 1987, having received its Distinguished Citizen of the Year award in 1985. She served as vice chairman of the board of directors of the Los Angeles World Affairs Council. In 1985, she founded the Los Angeles County High School for the Arts in Los Angeles. She later served on the board of trustees of the Los Angeles County Museum of Art (LACMA) and the Los Angeles Music Center. She was a recipient of the Phoenix Award from the USC Pacific Asia Museum in Pasadena, California. She established the Los Angeles Music Center's Caroline Leonetti Ahmanson Endowment Fund for Arts Education as a result of a charity dinner which raised $450,000 at the Beverly Wilshire Hotel in January, 1998. She served as Vice Chair of the Los Angeles Music Center Education Division from 1979 to 1998. She also co-hosted fundraisers for The Salvation Army.

== Personal life ==
Ahmanson married her first husband, Bernhardt Paul Heim (1917–2007), in 1940. They had a daughter, Margo O'Connell.

In 1965, Ahmanson married husband Howard F. Ahmanson Sr., the founder of H.F. Ahmanson & Co., an insurance and savings and loan company. She became a widow when he died in 1968, and moved into a penthouse suite at the Beverly Wilshire Hotel in Beverly Hills, California.

=== Death ===
She died of Alzheimer's disease-related complications on Tuesday, June 21, 2005 in Beverly Hills, California, at the age of 87.

== Legacy ==
- The Ahmanson Theatre in Los Angeles was named in her honor.
- The Leonetti/O'Connell Family Foundation, formerly known as the Caroline Leonetti Ahmanson Foundation, was founded in 1993.
