= Great Western Bank (California) =

American retail bank

Great Western Financial
- Trade name: Great Western Bank
- Type: Public
- Traded as: NYSE: GWF (1955–1997)
- Industry: Banking
- Founded: 1887; 139 years ago as Citizens Building & Loan in Santa Barbara; 1925; 101 years ago as Great Western Building & Loan in Los Angeles
- Defunct: July 1, 1997; 29 years ago
- Fate: Acquired by Washington Mutual, now JPMorgan Chase.
- Headquarters: Chatsworth, California
- Area served: California, Florida, Washington, Arizona, New York
- Website: archived official website

Great Western Bank (previously known as Great Western Savings & Loan) was a large retail bank that operated primarily in the Western United States. Great Western's headquarters were in Chatsworth, California. At one time, Great Western was one of the largest savings and loan in the United States, second only to Home Savings of America. The bank was acquired by Washington Mutual in 1997 for $6.8 billion.

Great Western Bank was held by Great Western Financial Corporation ("GWFC"), a corporation organized under the laws of the state of Delaware that was traded on the New York Stock Exchange under the stock symbol "GWF".

== History ==
=== Early years ===
Great Western can trace its lineage to the incorporation in 1925 of a savings and loan association called "Great Western Building and Loan Association" that was located in downtown Los Angeles and was founded by a group of Czech-American investors. Its first president was Chicago-born Czech-American Joseph F. Triska, but he was replaced by Czech-born investor and former Chicago resident Felix B. Janovsky in 1927, who ran the company for twenty years. As Janovsky also served as an honorary consul of Czechoslovakia (1928–1948), offices of Great Western served also as the consulate premises. Seventeen years later, the company changed its name to "Great Western Savings and Loan Association" in 1942. In 1947 it was acquired by Adolph Slechta, St. Louis-born American of Czech origin. By January 1948 the company had its main office in downtown on Flower street and a branch office on Crenshaw. The company opened a new building in 1956 at Crenshaw and Vernon to replace its previous branch on Crenshaw and to serve as its new headquarters.

In 1955, Great Western Corp. was formed as a publicly owned holding company for Great Western Savings and Loan Association and its subsidiaries through the issuance of stock and later changed its name to Great Western Financial Corp. the following year. The stock began listing on the American Stock Exchange in 1957.

Within five years, Great Western Financial acquired Bakersfield Savings (1956), Santa Ana Savings (1956), West Coast Savings of Sacramento (1957), Guaranty Savings of San Jose (1958), Central Savings of San Luis Obispo (1959), and First Savings of Oakland (1959). A change in the state law in 1965 allowed Great Western Financial to consolidate some of its separate saving and loan units. West Coast Savings and Guaranty Savings was merged into First Savings and Santa Ana Savings into Great Western Savings, leaving four separate S&L units and making its Great Western Savings unit the fourth largest S&L in the nation.

The company later bought Santa Rosa Savings (1968) and Safety Savings of south central Los Angeles (1969), Belmont Savings of Long Beach (1969), Citizens Savings of Santa Barbara (1969), and Victory Savings of North Hollywood (1970). Citizens Savings & Loan of Santa Barbara was founded in 1887, which Great Western later used as its foundation date.

In 1969, California changed their savings and loan association branching law to permit statewide branching. Prior to this change, branch offices were restricted to be within a 100-mile radius from their head office. When the new law went into effect at the beginning of 1970, Great Western Financial promptly merged First Savings in Oakland (Northern California) and Central Savings in San Luis Obispo (Central California) into Great Western Savings (Southern California), to form a single statewide savings and loan operating unit with 33 offices.

In 1970, Great Western acquired the financial troubled LFC Financial Corp. and its Equitable Savings subsidiary for $35 million worth exchange of stock. The acquisition made it the second largest savings and loan association in the country at that time. To satisfy federal anti-trust concerns, Great Western was required to sell 2 offices to State Mutual Savings (a subsidiary of Far West Financial Corp.) and 1 office to Home Federal Savings of San Diego. The company received some financial assistance in the acquisition from the FSLIC.

In March 1971, the company acquired Sentinel Savings of San Diego.

In September 1971, Great Western Financial asked the California State Saving and Loan Commissioner for his permission to allow the merger of Great Western Savings of Southern California, Great Western Savings of Central California, Great Western Savings of San Diego, Great Western Savings of Santa Barbara, and Great Western Savings of North Hollywood into its main subsidiary, Great Western Savings & Loan Association.

In 1970 and 1971, Great Western purchased four additional California savings and loan establishments.

=== 1980s–1990s ===
In the aftermath of the savings and loan crisis of the 1980s and 1990s, Great Western acquired many failed savings and loan offices from the Resolution Trust Corporation.

In December 1985, Great Western moved some administrative functions into a building that it partially owns in Chatsworth.

In October 1989, Great Western announced that they plan to move their headquarters to a yet to be built 10-story executive office building on a 20-acre site in Chatsworth that is adjacent to an existing nine-building service center with plans of selling their current Beverly Hills headquarters building. Great Western finally moved out of their Beverly Hills headquarters to their new headquarters in Chatsworth in May 1992.

In September 1993, Great Western announced that they were selling its Visa credit card operations to Associates Corporation of North America, part of the Ford Financial Services Group, which issues credit cards through Associates National Bank in Delaware.

On January 17, 1994, Great Western's administrative campus in Chatsworth, California, was particularly affected by the Northridge earthquake. Despite the quake, that year's profits quadrupled, thanks to the need for lower loss reserves and the gain on the sale of its 31 branches on Florida's Gulf Coast.

In 1995, Great Western's chairman James Montgomery passed the office of CEO to president John Maher, who accelerated the drive toward banking services.

In 1996, the company announced a $115 million restructuring program that would eliminate 800 jobs, consolidate mortgage banking branches, and install new technology. Later that year, Great Western sold its student loan business to Crestar Bank.

=== Expansion in California ===
In January 1982, Great Western announced the pending acquisition of Palo Alto–based Northern California Savings & Loan Association with its 61 offices for $61 million in stock. The acquisition was completed in August 1982.

In August 1986, Great Western announced the pending acquisition of 119 out 136 Southern California branch offices of the failed San Diego–based HomeFed Bank from the Resolution Trust Corporation for $151 million.

In October 1986, American Savings, a unit of Financial Corp. of America, announced that they were purchasing 13 offices plus the deposits of two offices that were being closed from Great Western for an undisclosed amount. All of the affected branch offices were located in Northern California.

In March 1991, Great Western announced the pending acquisition of the deposits and 28 branches of the failed Irvine-based Lincoln Savings and Loan Association from the Resolution Trust Corporation for $12.1 million.

In November 1991, Great Western announced the pending acquisition of five offices of the Woodland Hills–based Republic Federal Savings & Loan for an undisclosed amount. The acquisition was completed in March 1992.

In June 1994, Citicorp announced that they were selling the deposits of six San Diego County branches of Citibank, FSB, to Great Western Bank for an undisclosed amount.

=== Expansion in Florida ===
Great Western made its first expansion outside of California in February 1986 by the announcement of the pending acquisition of the failed Jacksonville Beach–based Intercapital Savings Bank from the Federal Savings and Loan Insurance Corporation for $20.9 million.

In August 1986, Great Western announced the pending acquisition of four offices in Broward County and Palm Beach County from the Miami-based Chase Federal Savings and Loan Association for an undisclosed amount.

In September 1986, Great Western announced the pending acquisition of the Pensacola-based Southern Home Savings Bank for $25 million in stock.

In December 1986, Great Western announced the pending acquisition of the Lake Worth–based SunPoint Savings Bank for $40 million in stock. The acquisition was completed in July 1987.

In July 1989, Great Western announced the pending acquisition of 63 out of 71 offices of the Miami-based CenTrust Bank for $150 million in cash. The pending acquisition represented $2.4 billion in CenTrust deposits. But the ailing bank was seized by Office of Thrift Supervision in February 1990 for "unsafe and unsound financial condition", before regulator approval could be obtained that would allow the sale to proceed. After negotiating with the Resolution Trust Corporation, Great Western paid the RTC $86 million in June 1990 for all 71 branch offices and $2.1 billion of failed CenTrust's $5.2 billion in deposits. Centrust's failure was the largest savings and loan failure at that time and it had cost the taxpayers $1.7 billion to protect its depositors.

In June 1990, Great Western announced the pending acquisition of the 13 out of 24 Florida offices of the ailing New Jersey–based Carteret Savings Bank for $26.5 million. The acquisition was completed in October 1990. The remainder of Carteret failed and was seized by Federal regulators in December 1992.

Also in June 1990, Great Western announced the pending acquisition of the 18 Florida branch offices with $700 million in deposits of the failed California-based Gibraltar Savings from the Resolution Trust Corporation for $3.75 million.

In September 1990, Great Western announced the pending acquisition of 27 Florida offices of the failed New Jersey–based City Federal Savings Bank from the Resolution Trust Corporation for $9.75 million.

In March 1991, Great Western announced the pending acquisition of all 33 offices of the failed Clearwater-based Pioneer Savings Bank from the Resolution Trust Corporation for $5.25 million.

In October 1991, Great Western announced the pending acquisition of the deposits and 23 offices of the failed Orlando-based The First FA from the Resolution Trust Corporation for $23.4 million.

In March 1992, Great Western announced the pending acquisition of the deposits of $1.8 billion and the 53 branch offices of the failed Orlando-based AmeriFirst Federal Savings Bank from the Resolution Trust Corporation for $27.5 million. Some of the acquired offices were closed due to close proximity existing Great Western branch offices.

In August 1994, Great Western announced that it was selling 31 branches in the western portion of the state of Florida, which included Tampa-St. Petersburg, to First Union for $75 million to focus on other parts of Florida.

=== Expansion in Arizona ===
Great Western made its first expansion into the state of Arizona in June 1987 by announcing the pending acquisition of the Phoenix-based First Commercial Savings & Loan Association for $17 million in cash. The acquisition was completed in January 1988.

=== Expansion in Washington ===
Great Western made its first expansion into the state of Washington in July 1987 by announcing the pending acquisition of the similar named Bellevue-based Great Western Savings Bank for $52.3 million. The acquisition was completed in February 1988.

In June 1989, Great Western announced that it was selling its six Spokane branch offices to Washington Trust Bank of Spokane for undisclosed amount. This move represented Great Western's withdraw from Eastern Washington state.

Three years later, Great Western finally exited the state of Washington by announcing in September 1992 that Great Western would swap its entire 13 branch offices in Washington for Seattle-based Pacific First's entire seven offices in Southern California.

=== Expansion in New York ===
Great Western made its first and only expansion into the state of New York in September 1987 by announcing the opening a New York state chartered savings bank in the city of White Plains that was able to accept consumer deposits and issue consumer loans, but unable to make commercial loans.

Unfortunately, Great Western was unable to expand further into the New York City metropolitan area and it quietly sold its only New York area office to Chemical Bank in 1990.

=== Acquisition by Washington Mutual ===
In early 1997 California thrift H. F. Ahmanson & Co. launched a hostile takeover bid for the company, but Washington Mutual's friendly offer won out later that year. Ironically, in 1998 Washington Mutual acquired Ahmanson for $10 billion. In 2008, it became part of JPMorgan Chase.

== Advertising ==
In 1971, the company adopted the GW "brand" while it consolidated its many savings units into one subsidiary.

=== Celebrity spokespersons ===
In October 1977, actor John Wayne filmed the first of several television commercials that he recorded over the next year for Great Western. In August 1978, Wayne, in full western garb, filmed the most famous of his commercials for the bank in the Sequoia National Forest.

After Wayne's death in 1979, Great Western went through a number of celebrity spokespersons including Ben Johnson, Glenn Ford, Barbara Stanwyck, Maureen O'Hara and John Huston before settling on Dennis Weaver who became their main spokesman from 1982 until 1996. The tagline of the bank's advertising campaign during this time was "We'll Always Be There".

=== John Wayne statue ===
As a tribute to their most notable celebrity spokesman, Great Western commission in 1984 a full-sized bronze statue of the actor John Wayne by noted American western-motif sculptor Harry Jackson to stand in front of their then Beverly Hills headquarters at 8484 Wilshire Boulevard. The building was later sold after the company relocated their headquarters to Chatsworth in 1992. Magazine publisher Larry Flynt later obtained the building and statue in 1994.

=== Naming rights and sponsors ===
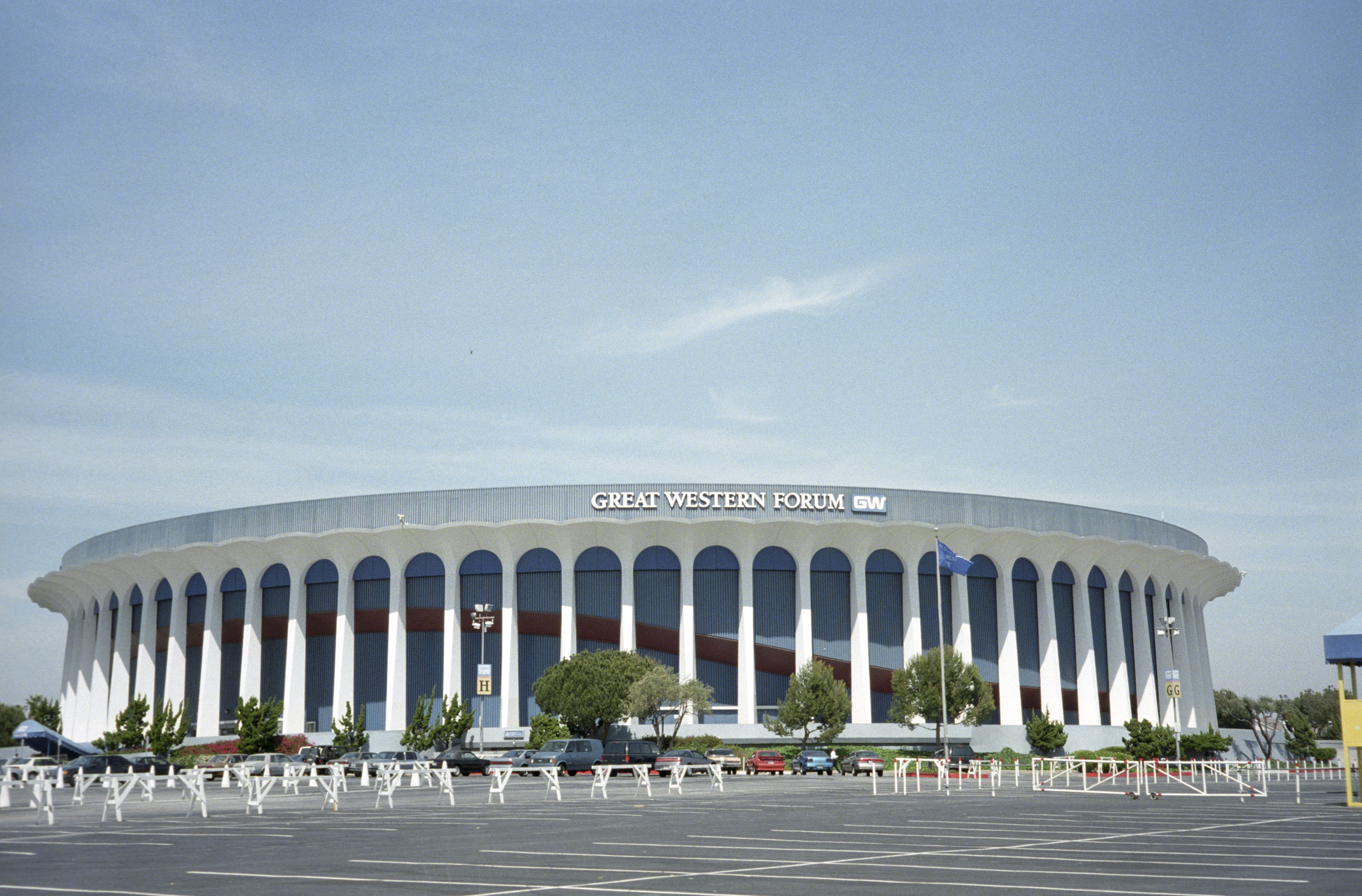
The Great Western Forum as shown in 1997

The Forum, an indoor arena in Inglewood, California, famous as the former home of the Los Angeles Lakers and Los Angeles Kings, was known as the "Great Western Forum" from 1988 to 2003. This name came from Great Western S&L, which paid for the naming rights on the arena in 1988. While naming rights to sports arenas and stadiums are now commonplace, such a thing was quite rare at the time of the deal. The name still remained for six years after Great Western had ceased to exist, with Washington Mutual letting the clock run on the deal without re-branding the arena as its teams departed. The 15-year naming rights contract expired in 2003, and the Great Western name was slowly removed from the arena; the last vestige, a weathered "GW" logo which painted atop the roof to attract the attention of passengers departing and arriving on planes from Los Angeles International Airport, was removed when the arena was renovated under new ownership in 2013. Chase Bank, the direct successor to Great Western after subsuming Washington Mutual's assets, became the sponsor of the Forum from 2014 until 2022 when Kia purchased the naming rights.
