= Wayne Oquin =

American classical composer

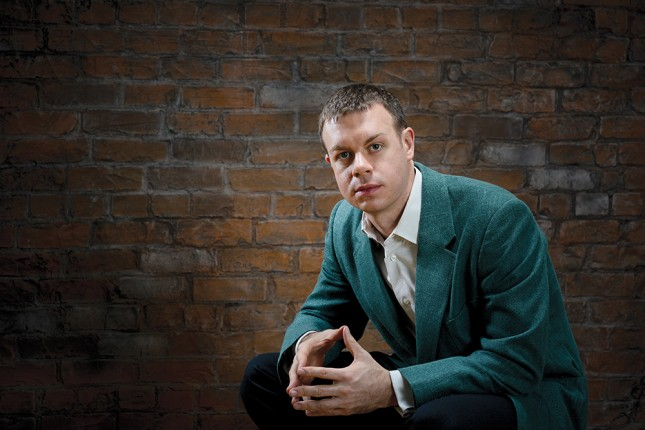
- Born: December 9, 1977 (age 48); Houston, Texas
- Education: The Juilliard School, Texas State University
- Website: https://www.wayneoquin.com/

Wayne Oquin (born December 9, 1977) is an American composer of orchestral, choral, chamber, and wind band music.

== Biography ==
Wayne Oquin is an American classical composer whose works have been performed by leading orchestras, including the Danish National Symphony Orchestra, Munich Philharmonic, Pacific Symphony, and the Philadelphia Orchestra. In 2020, the Nashville Symphony announced the premiere recording of Oquin's Resilience on the Naxos Label. In the same year, the Pacific Symphony announced the world symphonic premiere of his Tower Ascending.

In addition to his orchestral works, Oquin is also internationally recognized for his choral, chamber, and wind band music. He is a two-time winner of the National Band Association's William D. Revelli Award.

In 2008, Oquin joined the faculty of The Juilliard School where he teaches ear training (of which department he is the chair), music theory, and graduate studies.
