= Alexander Shelley =

British conductor (born 1979)

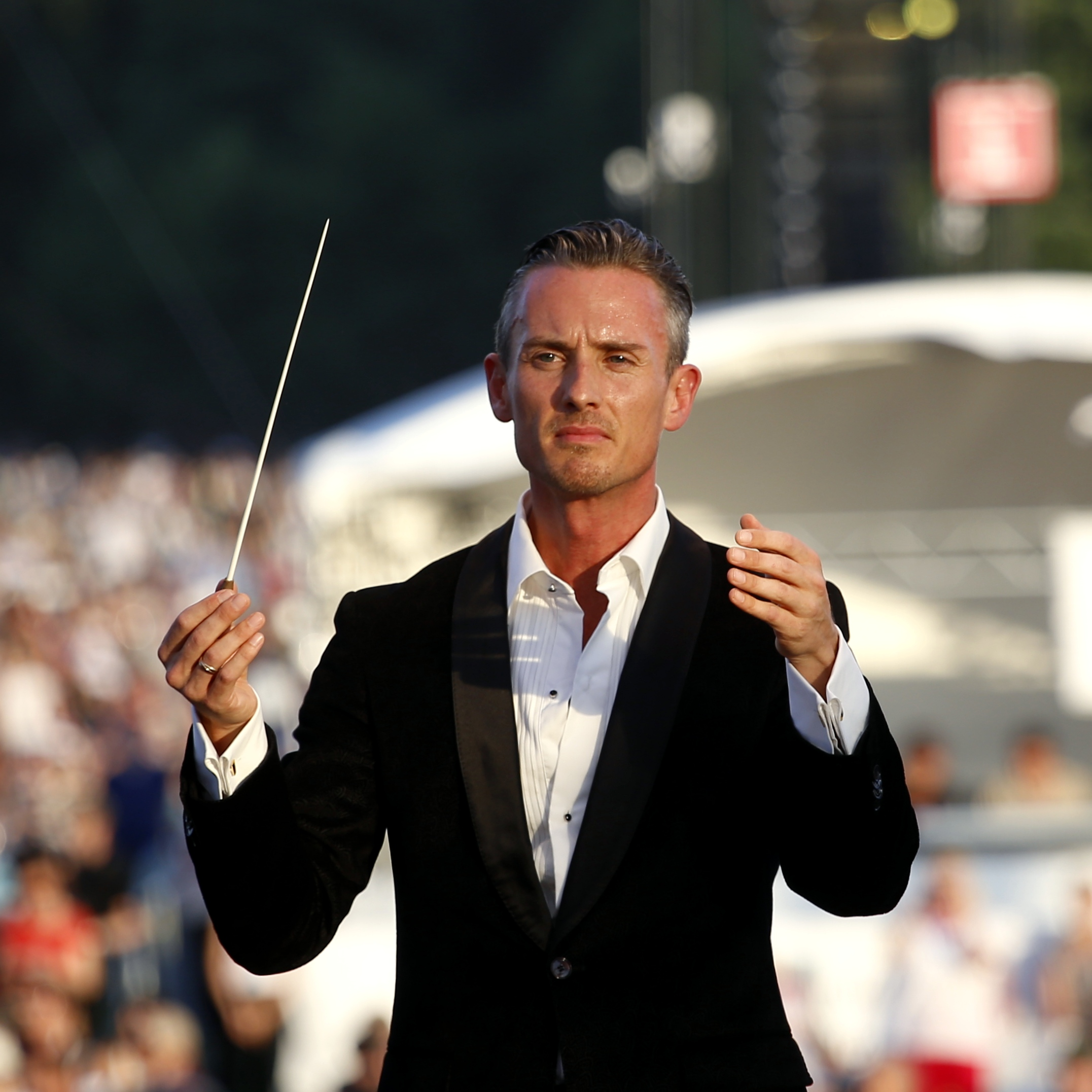
- Alexander Shelley

Background information
- Born: Alexander Gordon Shelley; 8 October 1979 (age 47); London, England
- Genre: Classical
- Occupation: Conductor
- Instruments: Cello, piano
- Years active: 2005–present
- Website: alexandershelley.com

Alexander Gordon Shelley (born 8 October 1979) is an English conductor. He is Artistic and Music Director of Artis—Naples and the Naples Philharmonic, Artistic and Music Director of the Pacific Symphony and Principal Conductor of National Symphony Orchestra Ireland. From 2015-2026 he served as Music director of the National Arts Centre Orchestra in Ottawa and as principal associate conductor of the Royal Philharmonic Orchestra. From 2009-2015 he was Chief Conductor of the Nuremberg Symphony Orchestra.

== Background ==
The son of British pianist-conductor Howard Shelley and Irish pianist Hilary Macnamara, Shelley learned piano from his mother and cello from his grandmother. In 1992, he won a music scholarship to Westminster School from The Hall School Hampstead. He studied cello with Timothy Hugh, Steven Doane and Johannes Goritzki at the Royal College of Music and at the Robert Schumann Hochschule, Düsseldorf respectively. Master-classes with Mstislav Rostropovich, Janos Starker and Aldo Parisot led him to France, Italy and North America. He was a member of the World Orchestra for Peace during the 2003 tour with Valery Gergiev. He studied conducting with Professor Thomas Gabrisch in Düsseldorf and worked closely with Yan Pascal Tortelier as his assistant conductor, among others with the National Youth Orchestra of Great Britain.

== Early career ==
In 2001, while still studying in Düsseldorf, he founded the Schumann Camerata, a chamber orchestra with whom he subsequently performed over 80 concerts, including a tour of Russia, with performances in Moscow, Kazan, Simbirsk, Samara, Saratov, Volgograd and Astrachan. In 2005, he won first prize in the 2005 Leeds Conductors Competition, with the press describing him as "the most exciting and gifted young conductor to have taken this highly prestigious award. His conducting technique is immaculate, everything crystal clear and a tool to his inborn musicality." In the same year, Shelley conceived the "440Hz" project, a series of concerts involving prominent German television and stage personalities, to attract young adults to the concert hall. Guest artists have included Götz Alsmann, Wise Guys, and Blank & Jones.

In 2009, Shelley became artistic director of the Zukunftslabor project of the Deutsche Kammerphilharmonie Bremen with whom he went on to win the 2012 Echo Klassik award in the category of Youth Engagement.

== Nuremberg Symphony Orchestra ==
In September 2009, Shelley was named the youngest-ever chief conductor of the Nuremberg Symphony Orchestra, with an initial contract of four years. In 2011, the orchestra extended his contract to 2017. During his tenure, the orchestra increased their international touring, travelling to China, Italy, the Czech Republic and Austria. Live recordings of their performances in Vienna's Musikverein and Prague's Smetana Hall were released on Colosseum Records.

For nine years, Shelley conducted and presented Nuremberg's ‘Klassik Open Air’ concerts. Over 80,000 people attended his final 'Klassik Open Air' concert. He concluded his Nuremberg tenure at the close of the 2016–2017 season.

Shelley's first album for Deutsche Grammophon, with Daniel Hope and the Stockholm Philharmonic, was released in September 2014. Shelley's second album for Deutsche Grammophon, a recording of an expanded version of Peter and the Wolf with Germany's National Youth Orchestra featuring Die Toten Hosen singer Campino (in the German version) and rock singer Alice Cooper (in the English version), was awarded the Echo Klassik prize in 2016.

== National Arts Centre Orchestra ==
In October 2013, the NACO announced the appointment of Shelley as its youngest ever music director, succeeding Pinchas Zukerman as of the 2015–2016 season, with an initial contract of 4 years. In 2018, the NAC Orchestra announced an extension of Shelley's contract to 2023. In 2022, a further contract extension through 2026 was announced. In May 2025, the NAC Orchestra announced that Shelley is to conclude his tenure as its music director.

Creative projects during his tenure have included the commissioning of "Life Reflected", a multi-media exploration of the lives of four Canadian women (Rita Joe, Roberta Bondar, Alice Munro and Amanda Todd) and ENCOUNT3RS, a set of three new ballets in collaboration with the National Ballet of Canada, Ballet BC and Alberta Ballet Company. The seven new scores that Shelley and the NAC Orchestra commissioned for these projects were recorded on the Analekta label in 2016 and 2017 respectively.

For two years running, works commissioned and recorded by Shelley and the NAC Orchestra won the Juno Award in the Classical Composition of the Year category, with Jocelyn Morlock winning in 2018 for her work 'My Name is Amanda Todd' from NAC Orchestra's Life reflected album, and Ana Sokolovic winning in 2019 for 'Golden Slumbers Kiss Your Eyes' from the NAC Orchestra's album Bounds of our Dreams.

Shelley has led four major tours with the NAC Orchestra. In 2017, Shelley and the NAC Orchestra undertook a cross-country tour of Canada in celebration of Canada's 150th anniversary.

In the spring of 2019, Shelley led the NAC Orchestra on a landmark European tour in celebration of the National Arts Centre's 50th Anniversary. Over 17 days, they travelled to Saffron-Walden, London, Paris, Utrecht, Copenhagen, Stockholm and Gothenburg. The tour marked the first international performances of the NAC Orchestra's flagship Life Reflected project. Entitled CROSSINGS, the tour included eight concerts featuring four internationally renowned Canadian soloists: Jan Lisiecki, James Ehnes, Erin Wall and David D Q Lee. Each concert included at least one major work by a Canadian composer, in addition to learning activities and community events.

In April 2022, Shelley led the orchestra on tour to Carnegie Hall with a programme entitled 'Truth in our Time'. The tour concerts included the world premiere of Philip Glass's 13th Symphony, commissioned by Shelley and the NAC in memory of the life of ABC News anchor Peter Jennings.

In May and June 2025, Shelley and NACO embarked on the orchestra's tour 99th since its founding in 1969. NACO returned to Japan for the first time in 40 years and made its debut in the Republic of Korea, presenting international premieres of works by the leading Canadian composers Kelly-Marie Murphy and Keiko Devaux. The venues included Seoul Arts Centre, Tokyo’s Suntory Hall, and the Osaka World Expo.

== United States career ==
In April 2023, Shelley was announced as artistic director and music director of Artis-Naples, home of The Baker Museum and the Naples Philharmonic, effective with the 2024-2025 season. In a role which expands on his predecessor Andrey Boreyko, Shelley is to provide artistic leadership for the Naples Philharmonic, as well as the entire multidisciplinary organization, which includes visual Arts, Naples International Film Festival, jazz, pops, dance and Broadway. In January 2026, Artis-Naples announced an extension of Shelley's contract with the organisation through the 2028-2029 season.

In November 2024, the Pacific Symphony Orchestra announced the appointment of Shelley as its next music director, effective with the 2026-2027 season, with an initial contract of five years. He holds the title of music director-designate for the 2025-2026 season.

== Other conducting work ==
In January 2015, after several years of collaborations as a guest conductor, the Royal Philharmonic Orchestra named Shelley its principal associate conductor. With the RPO, Shelley has curated annual thematic concert series in London's Cadogan Hall, as well as touring nationally and internationally with the orchestra.

In September 2025, the National Symphony Orchestra Ireland announced the appointment of Shelley as its next principal conductor, effective with the 2026-2027 season, with an initial contract of three seasons. He took the role of principal conductor-designate with immediate effect.

Shelley has a close relationship with Germany's National Youth Orchestra (Bundesjugendorchester), having led them on three tours of Germany and international tours to France, Canada and Africa. In November 2018, the Bundesjugendorchester sat side-by-side with the National Arts Centre Orchestra for a performance of Benjamin Britten's War Requiem, in commemoration of the 100th anniversary of the end of World War 1. In the summer of 2019, Shelley led the Bundesjugendorchester on a tour of Germany and Africa.

Shelley has conducted over 60 world premiere performances.

== Opera ==
Shelley's professional opera conducting debut was for Royal Danish Opera in 2008, conducting a production of The Merry Widow. He has since led productions of Gounod's Romeo et Juliette (Royal Danish Opera), Mozart's Cosi fan tutte (Opéra national de Montpellier), two separate productions of Marriage of Figaro (Opera North and National Arts Centre), La Bohème (Opera Lyra), Louis Riel (Canadian Opera Company/ National Arts Centre) Don Giovanni (National Arts Centre) and productions of Tosca (at Tyrolean State Theatre and Canada's National Arts Centre).

== Personal life, awards, and philanthropy ==
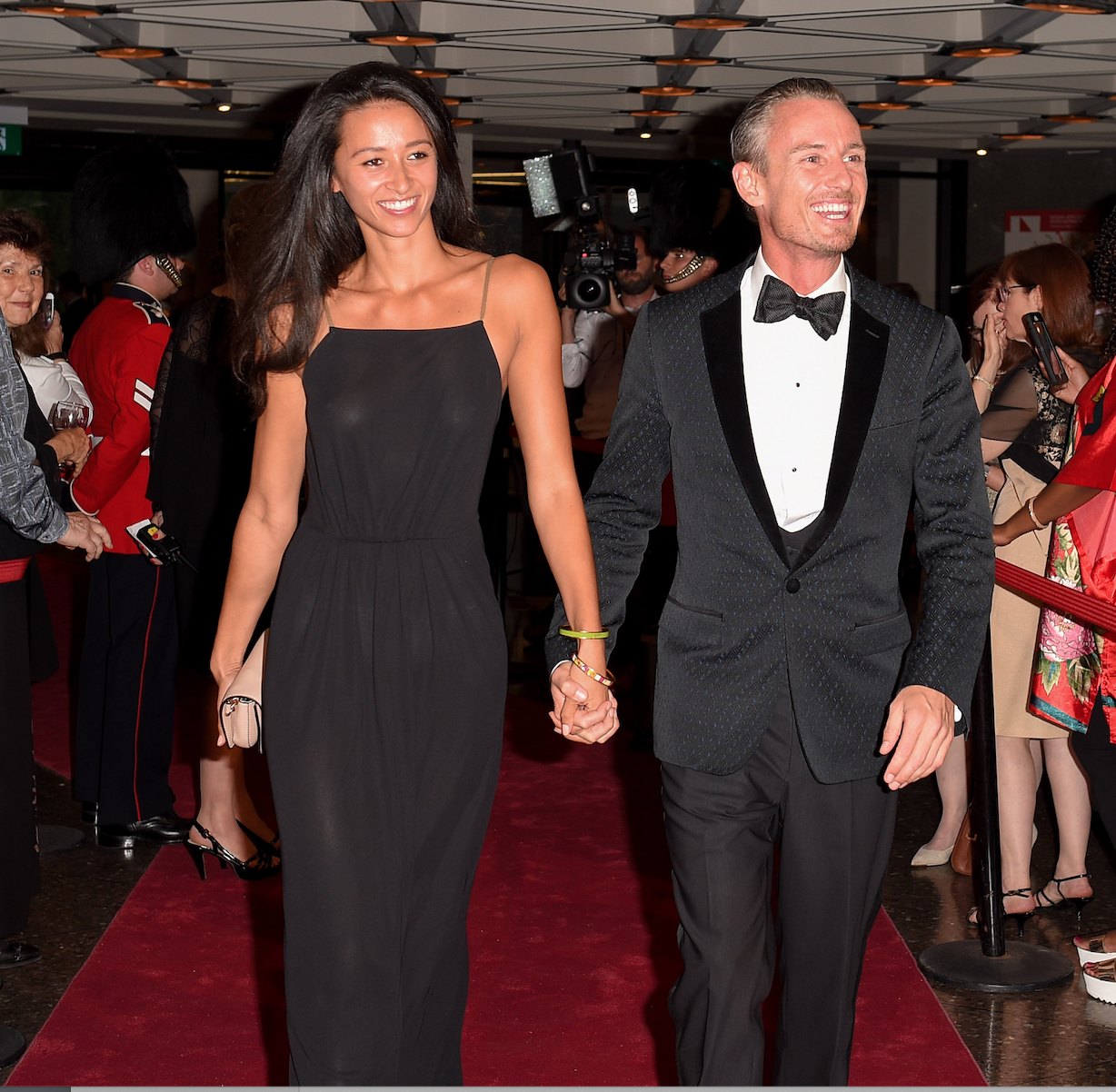
Alexander Shelley and Zoe Shelley at the NAC Gala

Shelley and his wife Zoe, a personal trainer and fitness model, were married in July 2011 at St Paul's Church, Knightsbridge. They have two sons, Sasha Felix Shelley, born in Ottawa on August 25, 2018, and Leo Arlen Shelley, born in Ottawa on June 6, 2021.

The president of Germany, Frank-Walter Steinmeier awarded Alexander Shelley the Cross of the Order of Merit of the Federal Republic of Germany 'in recognition of his exceptional achievements and profound impact on the international classical music community as well as his dedicated efforts to engage and inspire younger audiences.' The award was presented to Shelley during an official ceremony by the German ambassador in Ottawa, Canada, on July 12, 2023.

Along with Angela Hewitt and Kellylee Evans, Shelley is one of the current OrKidstra Ambassadors.

Ottawa Mayor Mark Sutcliffe declared July 2nd 2026 'Alexander Shelley Day'in Ottawa, reflecting 'Eleven seasons of music, mentorship, and community spirit, now etched into Ottawa’s history.

== Discography ==
- 2010: Nürnberger Symphoniker Live in Prag (Nürnberger Symphoniker and Oliver Triendl on Colosseum Records)
- 2011: Nürnberger Symphoniker Live in Wien (Nürnberger Symphoniker on Colosseum Records)
- 2014: Escape to Paradise (Stockholm Philharmonic and Daniel Hope on Deutsche Grammophon)
- 2015: Brahms Violin Concerto/ Double Concerto (Nürnberger Symphoniker, Eric Schumann, Mark Schumann on Berlin Classics)
- 2015: Peter and the Wolf in Hollywood (Bundesjugendorchester, Alice Cooper on Deutsche Grammophon) (ECHO Klassik 2016)
- 2017: Life Reflected (National Arts Centre Orchestra on Analekta)
- 2017: Encount3rs (National Arts Centre Orchestra on Analekta)
- 2018: New Worlds (National Arts Centre Orchestra on Analekta)
- 2018: Bounds of our Dreams (National Arts Centre Orchestra on Analekta)
- 2019: American Recorder Concertos (Copenhagen Philharmonic, Michala Petri)

Brahms and Schumann Symphony Cycles:

- 2020: Clara, Robert, Johannes: Darlings of the Muses (National Arts Centre Orchestra, Gabriela Montero on Analekta)
- 2021: Clara, Robert, Johannes: Lyrical Echoes (National Arts Centre Orchestra on Analekta)
- 2023: Clara, Robert, Johannes: Atmosphere and Mastery (National Arts Centre Orchestra on Analekta)
- 2023: Clara, Robert, Johannes: Romance and Counterpoint (National Arts Centre Orchestra on Analekta)

- 2024: Truth in our Time (National Arts Centre Orchestra on Analekta) (including world premiere recording of Philip Glass Symphony No. 13
- 2024: Two Orchestras, One Symphony (Hetu Symphony No. 5)(National Arts Centre Orchestra, Orchestre Symphonique de Québec, Toronto Mendelssohn Choir on Analekta)

Poema Cycle (Strauss tone poems&new commissions):

- 2025: Poema 1: Ad Astra (National Arts Centre Orchestra on Analekta)
- 2025: Poema 2: Terra Nova (National Arts Centre Orchestra on Analekta)

Cultural offices
Preceded by Bernhard Gueller	Chief conductor, Nuremberg Symphony Orchestra; 2009–2017	Succeeded by Kahchun Wong
Preceded by Pinchas Zukerman	Music director, National Arts Centre Orchestra; 2015–2026	Succeeded by John Storgårds
Preceded by Andrey Boreyko (Music Director)	Artistic and music director, Artis-Naples and Naples Philharmonic; 2023–present	Succeeded by incumbent
Preceded by Carl St. Clair (Music Director)	Artistic and music director, Pacific Symphony; 2025–present	Succeeded by incumbent
Preceded by Jaime Martín	Principal conductor, National Symphony Orchestra (Ireland); 2026–present	Succeeded by incumbent
