= Keith Clark (conductor) =

American composer, conductor, and music educator

Keith Clark is an American composer, conductor, and music educator who is best known for founding the Pacific Symphony and the Astoria Music Festival. Active globally as a conductor, he has an extensive discography with symphonies internationally, including the London Philharmonic, Vienna Chamber Orchestra, Slovak State Philharmonic, Prague Radio Symphony Orchestra, Seoul Philharmonic Orchestra, and Pacific Symphony among others. He is currently Principal Guest Conductor of the Siberian Chamber Orchestra in Omsk, Russia, Principal Conductor of the Amadeus Opera Ensemble in Salzburg, Artistic Director of Portland Summerfest's Opera in the Park, and Artistic Director of the Astoria Music Festival.

== Early life, family, and education ==
Born in Illinois, Clark grew up in Ottawa, Illinois in a century-old farmhouse just southwest of Chicago. Clark's father, also named Keith, was a high school teacher and folk singer and instrumentalist who travelled around the midwest collecting folk songs, much in the way that Bartok and Kodaly had done earlier. His father was a close friend of Pete Seeger, whom he met in New York City while making recordings for Folkway Records. They later attended classes at Harvard University together, including a class taught by the poet Robert Frost, played on the same softball team, and spent time together with the author Truman Capote. His father sometimes played as a member in Seeger's band.

Clark's father turned the family's large barn into a theater that seated several hundred people for public performances. The theater became a popular stopping place for many of the great American folk musicians in the 1950s and 1960s, including Seeger, during the American folk music revival, and was also used as a venue for artists who had been blacklisted during the McCarthy era or to non-white entertainers who were discriminated from performing prior to the Civil Rights Act.

He displayed an early talent for composing music, and published his first piece at the age of 18. At the age of 19 he became Roger Wagner's assistant, serving as accompanist to the Roger Wagner Chorale while an undergraduate student at the University of California, Los Angeles. During this time he lived with composer Roy Harris from whom he rented a room.

While working with Wagner, Clark had the opportunity to work with Zubin Mehta. Mehta convinced Clark to take a year studying music in Europe, and then come back to UCLA and study with him. Taking his advice and utilizing Mehta's connections, he studied music composition and conducting with Franco Ferrara in Siena and Hans Swarowsky in Vienna. He then decided to remain in Europe to complete his undergraduate studies in music composition and conducting at the Accademia Musicale Chigiana where he earned diplomas in both subjects and was awarded the schools' Conducting Prize. He later pursued graduate studies at the Vienna Music Academy (now the University of Music and Performing Arts Vienna) as a Fulbright Scholar, and returned to UCLA where he earned his Doctorate in music theory.

== Career ==
Clark began his career in the 1960s in Europe, working chiefly out of Austria, but also serving as guest conductor with symphonies throughout Europe, including the London Philharmonic. He was particularly active in Vienna during the 1970s; having several of his own operas performed at the Vienna Festival during that decade, serving as Assistant Conductor of the World Youth Orchestra in Vienna under Leonard Bernstein, and working as Principal Guest Conductor of the Vienna Chamber Orchestra. With that orchestra he conducted numerous concerts, made several radio and television broadcasts in Vienna and abroad for BBC, and made several recordings.

In 1978, Clark became director of orchestras and opera conductor at California State University in Fullerton, California. There he established the Pacific Chamber Orchestra, the precursor to the Pacific Symphony, as a part-student, part-professional, part-community ensemble during his first year of teaching Under his leadership, the orchestra soon became a fully professional orchestra with a subscription season and a subscriber base of more than three thousand people. In 1988 he resigned from his post, after being forced out by the orchestra's board of directors.

In 2003 Clark co-founded the Astoria Music Festival in Astoria, Oregon with soprano Ruth Dobson, and has served as the Artistic Director of the festival from 2003 until the present. In 2006 he became Principal Guest Conductor of the Siberian State Philharmonic and was appointed Artistic Director of the Novosibirsk Globus Theatre where he notably staged the Russian premiere of Bernstein's West Side Story in 2007. He later conducted the Moscow premiere of the musical in 2010.

Clark has also worked as a guest conductor with many orchestras and ensembles during his career, including the Boston Symphony Orchestra. He is currently Principal Guest Conductor of the Siberian Chamber Orchestra in Omsk, Russia, Principal Conductor of the Amadeus Opera Ensemble in Salzburg, Artistic Director of Portland Summerfest's Opera in the Park, and Artistic Director of the Astoria Music Festival.

== Discography ==
year	title	soloist(s)	conductor, orchestra	studio	record label
1981	Harris: Symphony No. 6 "Gettysburg"		Keith Clark, Pacific Symphony Orchestra	studio; March 7, 1981	Varèse Sarabande VCD 47245
1984	Menotti / Barber: Violin Concertos	Ruggiero Ricci, violin	Keith Clark, Pacific Symphony Orchestra	studio	Varèse Sarabande VCD 47239
1985	Respighi: Church Windows; Poema Autunnale	Ruggiero Ricci, violin	Keith Clark, Pacific Symphony Orchestra	studio	Reference Recordings
1985	Copland: Appalchian Spring Suite; Eight Poems of Emily Dickinson	Marni Nixon, soprano	Keith Clark, Pacific Symphony Orchestra	studio; Feb. 23, 1985	Varèse Sarabande VCD 47245; later on Reference Recordings
1986	Nanes: Symphony No. 1 "Atlantis, the Sunken City"; Symphony No. 2 "The False Benediction"	Christopher Bouver-Broadbent, organ	Keith Clark, London Philharmonic Orchestra	Abbey Road Studios	Delfon Recording Society
1987	Glière: Symphony No. 2; The Zaporozhian Cossacks		Keith Clark, Slovak Radio Symphony Orchestra	Bratislava studio; Nov. 19-29	Marco Polo
1988	Mendelssohn / Bruch: Violin Concertos	Mariko Honda, violin	Keith Clark, Slovak Philharmonic	Concert Hall of the Slovak Philharmonic; April 11–16	Naxos
1988	Tchaikovsky: Violin Concerto; Sérénade mélancolique; Souvenir d’un lieu cher	Mariko Honda, violin	Keith Clark, Slovak Philharmonic, Slovak Radio Symphony Orchestra	studio	Naxos
1988	French Festival		Keith Clark, Slovak Radio Symphony Orchestra	studio	Naxos
