= Robert H. Ahmanson =

American businessman and philanthropist

- Born: February 14, 1927; Omaha, Nebraska, US
- Died: September 1, 2007 (aged 80); Los Angeles, California, US
- Occupations: Businessman, philanthropist
- Spouse: Kathleen Ahmanson
- Children: 3, including William Ahmanson
- Relatives: William H. Ahmanson (brother); Howard F. Ahmanson, Sr. (uncle); Howard Ahmanson, Jr. (cousin)

Robert H. Ahmanson (February 14, 1927 – September 1, 2007) was an American businessman and philanthropist from Los Angeles, California. He was a corporate director of H.F. Ahmanson & Co. and served as the President of The Ahmanson Foundation from 1974 to 2007.

== Biography ==
=== Early life ===
Robert H. Ahmanson was born on February 14, 1927, in Omaha, Nebraska. He graduated from the University of California, Los Angeles (UCLA) in 1949. He had a brother, William H. Ahmanson. His father served as the President of the National American Insurance Co. of Omaha. His uncle, Howard F. Ahmanson, Sr., was the founder of H.F. Ahmanson & Co., an insurance and savings and loan corporation based in Los Angeles.

=== Business career ===
He served on the Board of Directors of H.F. Ahmanson & Co. until 1995.

=== Philanthropy ===
He served on the board of trustees of The Ahmanson Foundation from 1952 to 2007, and as its president from 1974 to 2007. He also served on the board of trustees of the Jules Stein Eye Institute and the Brain Mapping Medical Research Organization. Moreover, he served on the board of trustees of the Los Angeles County Museum of Art (LACMA).

A supporter of education, he served on the board of trustees of the Marlborough School. Additionally, he served on the board of governors of the UCLA Foundation. He was a Fellow of the College of Letters & Science at UCLA and a recipient of the UCLA Medal. He was the recipient of honorary doctorates from the Hebrew University of Jerusalem, Pepperdine University, the Art Center College of Design and Creighton University.

=== Personal life ===
He was married to Kathleen Ahmanson for fifty-two years. They had two sons, William Ahmanson and Robert Hayden Ahmanson, and a daughter, Karen Ahmanson Hoffman.

=== Death ===
He died on September 1, 2007, in Los Angeles, California. He was buried in Omaha, Nebraska.

== Legacy ==
His son William H. Ahmanson serves as the President of The Ahmanson Foundation.
