= Pacific Symphony Youth Orchestra =

The Pacific Symphony Youth Orchestra (PSYO) is a premier and widely recognized youth symphony orchestra based in Orange County, California, affiliated with the professional Pacific Symphony. Founded in 1993, PSYO was the first educational initiative of Pacific Symphony and is regarded as the preeminent youth orchestra in the Orange County and greater Los Angeles region, known for its high artistic standards and competitive auditions.

PSYO is one of four ensembles within the Pacific Symphony Youth Ensembles (PSYE) program and provides advanced symphonic training to highly talented student musicians in grades 9–12. The orchestra offers its members opportunities to rehearse with Pacific Symphony musicians, receive professional orchestral coaching, and perform full symphonic repertoire. PSYO presents its concert series in the Renée and Henry Segerstrom Concert Hall at the Segerstrom Center for the Arts.

== History ==
The Pacific Symphony Youth Orchestra was established in 1993 by the leadership of Pacific Symphony as an effort to cultivate the next generation of orchestral musicians in Southern California. Initially consisting of fewer than 50 musicians, the orchestra grew steadily in size and artistic capability throughout the late 1990s and early 2000s. In 2007, the PSYE umbrella organization was formed, adding additional youth ensembles and solidifying PSYO as the flagship full symphony orchestra of the program.

Over the years, PSYO has expanded its educational initiatives, including sectional coaching, master classes, peer mentoring, leadership opportunities within the ensemble, and direct interaction with composers and conductors. The orchestra has premiered new works, engaged in community performances, and established itself as one of the most competitive youth orchestras on the West Coast.

== Music directors ==
- 2025–present: Pola Benke
- 2020–2025: Jacob Sustaita
- 2015–2020: Roger Kalia
- 2012–2015: Alejandro Gutierrez
- 2008–2012: Maxim Eshkenazy
- 2002–2008: Michael Hall
- 1993–2002: Founding period conductors and early artistic leadership

== Auditions and membership ==
Membership in PSYO is determined through annual competitive auditions held in late spring and early summer. Applicants perform orchestral excerpts and solo selections,and must demonstrate advanced technical and musical proficiency. The orchestra typically consists of approximately 90–100 musicians, representing diverse high schools and educational backgrounds across Southern California. Many members also participate in regional honor ensembles, All-State groups, chamber music programs, and competitive solo festivals.

== Educational philosophy ==
PSYO emphasizes professional-level discipline and artistic growth. The educational model includes:

- weekly rehearsals at the Pacific Symphony artistic facility
- sectionals led by Pacific Symphony members
- seminars in orchestral professionalism, leadership, and audition preparation
- exposure to the symphonic masterworks and contemporary compositions
- coaching in ensemble communication and orchestral technique

The orchestra fosters both musical development and interpersonal collaboration, aiming to prepare students not only as musicians but also as disciplined and creative contributors to cultural life.

== Collaborations and performances ==
PSYO regularly collaborates with Pacific Symphony artists, guest soloists, and occasionally with other youth ensembles within PSYE. Major annual performances are held at the Renée and Henry Segerstrom Concert Hall, with additional outreach or community performances occasionally taking place at schools, civic venues, or regional arts festivals. Selected performances have included multimedia programming and educational outreach aligned with Pacific Symphony's artistic initiatives.

== Notable alumni ==
Alumni of PSYO have gone on to study at leading conservatories, universities, and music schools, including:

- Juilliard School
- New England Conservatory
- Manhattan School of Music
- USC Thornton School of Music
- UCLA Herb Alpert School of Music
- Berklee College of Music
- Colburn School

Many alumni continue to perform professionally in orchestras, chamber groups, and ensembles, while others pursue careers in composition, music education, and arts administration.

== Summer programs and training ==
Members of the Pacific Symphony Youth Orchestra frequently continue their musical development through acceptance into selective national and international summer music programs. PSYO musicians have attended and earned positions in the following highly competitive institutions and training festivals:

- Kennedy Center National Symphony Orchestra Summer Music Institute (NSO SMI)
- Carnegie Hall National Youth Orchestra programs (NYO-USA, NYO2, and NYO Jazz)
- Interlochen Arts Camp and Interlochen Summer Music programs
- Heifetz International Music Institute
- Boston University Tanglewood Institute (BUTI)
- Idyllwild Arts Summer Program
- Texas Chamber Music Institute (TCMI)
- other regional, collegiate, and international training academies

Participation in these programs reflects the advanced caliber of PSYO members and the orchestra's emphasis on rigorous musical preparation and professional-level orchestral experience.

== Repertoire ==
=== 2019–2020 season ===
- "Three Cornered Hat", Falla
- "Danzon No. 2", Marquez
- "Young Person's Guide to an Orchestra", Britten
- "Estancia", Ginastera
- "Luminosity", Rogerson
- "Symphony No. 5", Shostakovich
- "Symphony No. 8", Beethoven
- "Flute Concerto", Ibert
- "Violin Concerto No. 5", Vieuxtemps
- "Pines of Rome", Respighi

=== 2018–2019 season ===
- "On the Waterfront: Symphonic Suite", Bernstein
- "The Planets", Holst
- "Appalachian Springs for Small Ensemble", Copland
- "Symphony No. 2", Rachmaninoff
- "Concertino for Trombone", David
- "Cello Concerto in B minor", Dvorak
- "Rite of Spring", Stravinsky

=== 2017–2018 season ===
- "Roman Carnival Overture", Berlioz
- "Journey Suite", Wintory
- "Firebird Suite (1919)", Stravinsky
- "Analog Intelligence", Faegre
- "Symphony No. 1 (Titan)", Mahler
- "Violin Concerto in A minor", Glazunov
- "Violin Concerto in D minor", Sibelius
- "American in Paris", Gershwin

=== 2016–2017 season ===
- "Ruslan and Ludmila Overture", Glinka
- "Selection from Porgy and Bess", Gershwin
- "Symphony No. 3 (Organ)", Saint-Saëns
- "Overture to Die Meistersinger", Wagner
- "Billy the Kid Suite", Copland
- "Church Windows", Respighi
- "Poem for Flute and Orchestra", Griffes
- "Violin Concerto", Tchaikovsky
- "Symphony No. 2 I. Allegro Maestoso", Mahler

=== 2015–2016 season ===
- "Finlandia", Sibelius
- "Carmen Suite", Bizet
- "Pictures at an Exhibition", Mussorgsky
- "Mars and Jupiter from The Planets", Holst
- "Imperial March from Star Wars Suite", Williams
- "Symphonic Dances from West Side Story", Bernstein
- "Suite from Der Rosenkavalier", Strauss
- "Bacchanale from Samson and Delilah", Saint-Saëns
- "Symphony No. 4", Tchaikovsky

=== 2014–2015 season ===
- "Candide Overture", Bernstein
- "Swan Lake Suite", Tchaikovsky
- "Pines of Rome", Respighi
- "Russian Easter Overture", Rimsky-Korsakov
- "Main Theme and Imperial March from Star Wars Suite", Williams
- "Superman", Williams
- "Symphony No. 8", Dvorak
- "Saint-Saens Violin Concerto"
- "Dvorak Cello Concerto"
- "Tarentella", Bottesini
- "Symphony No. 5", Shostakovich

=== 2013–2014 season ===
- "4 Norwegian Dances", Grieg
- "La Forza del Destino Overture", Verdi
- "Symphony No. 3 (Organ)", Saint-Saëns
- "Inner Sanctum and the Egg Travels", Newton Howard
- "Jurassic Park", Williams
- "Romeo and Juliet Suites 1 and 2", Prokofiev
- "Tuning Up", Varese
- "Suite Estancia", Ginastera
- "Symphony No. 5", Tchaikovsky
- "Fantasie Brillante", Borne
- "Cello Concerto No. 2", Haydn
- "Symphonie Espagnole", Lalo
- "Tuba Concerto in F Minor", Vaughan Williams

=== 2008–2009 season ===
- "Capriccio Espagnol", Rimsky-Korsakov
- "Andante Cantabile for Strings", Tchaikovsky
- "Snow Dance", Przytulski
- "Hary Janos Suite", Kodály
- "Symphonic Dances from West Side Story", Bernstein
- "Polovtsian Dances from the Opera Prince Igor", Borodin
- Symphony No. 1: "Titan", Gustav Mahler

=== 2007–2008 season ===
- "Finlandia", Sibelius
- "Serenade for Winds", Strauss
- "Scheherazade", Rimsky-Korsakov
- Symphony No. 2: "Totenfeier", Gustav Mahler
- "Tzigane", Ravel
- "Symphony No. 5", Beethoven
- "Festive Overture", Dmitri Shostakovich
- "Radiant Voices", Frank Ticheli
- "Swan Lake Suite", Tchaikovsky

== See also ==
- Pacific Symphony
- Segerstrom Center for the Arts
- Youth orchestras
