= William H. Ahmanson =

American chief executive

- Born: October 12, 1925; Omaha, Nebraska, US
- Died: October 14, 2008 (aged 83); Malibu, California, US
- Occupations: Businessman, philatelist, philanthropist
- Spouse: Carol Ahmanson
- Children: 8
- Relatives: Robert H. Ahmanson (brother); Howard F. Ahmanson Sr. (uncle); Howard Ahmanson Jr. (cousin)

William H. Ahmanson (October 12, 1925 – October 14, 2008) was an American chief executive, philatelist and philanthropist from Los Angeles, California. He was the chairman and chief executive officer of H. F. Ahmanson & Co. from 1969 to 1984. He also was vice chairman of The Ahmanson Foundation.

== Early life and education ==
William Hayden. Ahmanson was born on October 12, 1925, in Omaha, Nebraska. He had a brother, Robert H. Ahmanson. His father was president of the National American Insurance Co. of Omaha. His uncle, Howard F. Ahmanson Sr., was the founder of H. F. Ahmanson & Co., an insurance and savings and loans corporation based in Los Angeles. He graduated from the University of California, Los Angeles (UCLA) with a bachelor's degree in business and finance in 1949.

== Career ==
He was chief executive officer and chairman of H. F. Ahmanson & Co. from 1969 to 1984. He was on the board of trustees of The Ahmanson Foundation from 1952 to 2008. Over the course of his career, he supported many venues related to the arts and sciences, including the Greater Los Angeles Zoo Association, the California Institute of the Arts, and the Doheny Eye Institute.

As a philatelist, he donated his extensive collection of Canadian stamps from British Columbia, Vancouver Island, New Brunswick, Nova Scotia, Prince Edward Island, and Newfoundland to the National Postal Museum. It is known as the "Ahmanson Collection."

== Personal life ==
He was married to Carol Ahmanson. They had eight children and twelve grandchildren. He died of emphysema on October 14, 2008, in Malibu, California.
