= Home Federal Savings and Loan Association (North Carolina) =

Home Federal Savings and Loan Association was a federal stock savings and loan association operating in Fayetteville, North Carolina, Lumberton, North Carolina, and Spring Lake, North Carolina with consolidated assets of $155.6 million, as of July 31, 1997. The Institution was wholly owned by Green Street Financial Corporation, Fayetteville, North Carolina, a unitary nondiversified holding company. The Institution had a main office at 241 Green Street in downtown Fayetteville, one branch on Raeford Road in Fayetteville, one branch in Spring Lake, and one branch in Lumberton. Home Federal's staff consisted of 30 full-time employees and two part-time employees as of July 31, 1997.

Home Federal operated as a traditional thrift originating adjustable and fixed rate mortgages for the construction, purchase, and refinancing of single-family dwellings. In addition, Home Federal offered home equity loans. The Institution also offered share loans, as well as loans secured by unimproved lots. Home Federal did not sell loans in the secondary market, but retained them in its own portfolio.

Between January 1, 1995, and June 30, 1997, Home Federal originated 693 loans totaling $53.7 million. This represents an average loan amount of $78,000. A review of the OTS's Thrift Financial Report for Home Federal disclosed that as of June 30, 1997, residential permanent mortgages totaled $111.9 million, and nonresidential mortgages totaled $14.3 million, or 68.2 percent and 9.2 percent of total assets, respectively. As of that date, cash and investments totaled $26.5 million, or 17.1 percent of total assets.

Home Federal Savings and Loan Association was purchased by New South Bank Company of Washington, North Carolina, and the subsequent company assumed the name First South Bank.
