= HomeFed Bank =

American savings and loan association

HomeFed Bank was an American savings and loan association based in San Diego. It was founded by Charles K. Fletcher as Home Federal Savings and Loan Association in 1934 with $9,500, including $2,000 of his own and $7,500 from friends. At the time, new federal legislation in the Home Owners' Loan Corporation Act had created a new industry for mortgage finance. Home Federal's assets grew to $4 million within eight years. In 1983, it became a public company. It changed its name from Home Federal Savings and Loan to HomeFed Bank in 1989. That year, HomeFed achieved a company record $115.7 million in earnings.

In November 1990, HomeFed warned federal regulators that its non-performing loans could increase by $250 million in the fourth quarter to a total of about $1 billion if the economy did not improve. At the time, it was the country's fifth-largest savings and loan with $19.1 billion in assets and 215 branches.

The federal regulators took control of HomeFed in July 1992 when the company became insolvent. At that time, HomeFed was one of the largest savings and loans seized by the government. In December 1993, the Resolution Trust Corporation sold 119 branches to Great Western Bank, eight to Home Savings of America, four to First Interstate Bank and three to First Federal Bank of California.

== See also ==
- List of largest U.S. bank failures
