= Howard F. Ahmanson Sr. =

American businessman and philanthropist

Howard Fieldstad Ahmanson Sr.
- Born: July 1, 1906; Omaha, Nebraska, U.S.
- Died: June 17, 1968 (aged 61); Belgium
- Resting place: Forest Lawn Memorial Park, Glendale
- Occupations: Businessman, philanthropist
- Spouses: Dorothy Johnston Grannis; Caroline Leonetti Ahmanson
- Children: Howard Ahmanson Jr.
- Relatives: William H. Ahmanson (nephew); Robert H. Ahmanson (nephew)

Howard Fieldstad Ahmanson Sr. (July 1, 1906 – June 17, 1968) was an American businessman and philanthropist. He was the founder of an insurance and savings and loan association, H.F. Ahmanson & Co. He made his fortune during the Great Depression selling fire insurance for property under foreclosure. He also bought real estate and invested in oil.

== Early life ==
Ahmanson was born on July 1, 1906, in Omaha, Nebraska. When his father died in 1925, he moved with his mother to Los Angeles, California. He enrolled at the University of Southern California, graduating in 1927 with a B.S. in Business Administration. In college, he began selling fire insurance for National American Fire Insurance, a company founded by his father. Enlisting in the United States Navy in 1943, he spent a year in Washington, D.C., as a procurement officer.

== Career ==
Ahmanson launched his career by selling fire insurance in the late 1920s. During the Great Depression, he specialized in fire insurance on foreclosed properties and began buying real estate, which began to build his fortune. Through the rest of the decade, his business grew as he specialized in serving savings and loans. In 1944, while still on active duty in the Navy, he acquired control of National American Fire Insurance. After returning to Los Angeles in 1945, he began investing in savings and loans. In 1947, he bought Home Building and Loan (later known as Home Savings). In an era when state and federal regulations limited branching, Ahmanson and his top executive, Kenneth D. Childs took advantage of the home construction and real estate boom around Los Angeles to make Home Savings and Loan the largest thrift in the United States.

== Political activism ==
Involved with the California Republican Party since the mid-1930s, Ahmanson began to take a more active role in 1954 when his long-time friend Goodwin Knight ran for governor. With the Republican National Convention slated to be held in San Francisco in 1956 and the possibility that two favorite sons—Knight and Richard Nixon—might be running for president, Ahmanson became the focal point for a bitter fight within the party when Knight picked him to become vice chairman of the party. Although Ahmanson was elected to the position, the fight further poisoned the relationship between Knight and Nixon. After a heart attack, Ahmanson was forced to relinquish the position and withdraw from political leadership.

== Philanthropy ==
Beginning in the mid-1950s, Ahmanson began to play a major role in the cultural life of Los Angeles. He served on the board of the Museum of Science and Industry, helped found the support organization for the Los Angeles County Art Institute (also known as the Otis Art Institute), gave $2 million to help fund the construction of the Los Angeles County Museum of Art, provided a major gift to support construction of the Los Angeles Music Center, and provided generous funding to his alma mater, the University of Southern California. He gave $1 million in 1962 to help fund the development of a biosciences research center.

He also influenced the cultural life of Southern California when he hired the artist Millard Sheets in 1953 to begin designing Home Savings' branches. Sheets integrated the work of local muralists, ceramic and glass artists into the design of the buildings.

== Yachting ==
A successful yachtsman, he bought his first racing vessel in 1948 and named it Sirius. For years, he sailed out of the Newport Harbor. He was a multiple winner of the San Diego to Acapulco Race. In 1961, he and his crew aboard the M class yacht Sirius II (formerly Barlovento) won the Transpac race to Honolulu. His crew included USC President Norman Topping, architect William Pereira and architect Bill Ficker who later was skipper of Intrepid, winner of the 1970 America's Cup.

== Personal life ==
On June 24, 1933, he married Dorothy Johnston Grannis (1907-1979) in Los Angeles. In 1950 they had a son, Howard Fielstad Ahmanson Jr. The couple divorced in 1962. On January 14, 1965, he married Caroline Leonetti Ahmanson, a fashion consultant who was a regular on the Art Linkletter show.

=== Death ===
He died on June 17, 1968, while traveling with his wife and son in Belgium. A major portion of his assets went to the Ahmanson Foundation in Los Angeles.
