= Home Federal Bank =

American financial services company

- Company type: Subsidiary
- Traded as: Nasdaq: HFFC
- Industry: Finance and Insurance
- Founded: 1929; 97 years ago
- Fate: Acquired
- Successor: Great Western Bank
- Headquarters: Sioux Falls, South Dakota
- Number of locations: 27
- Key people: Stephen M. Bianchi (president & CEO)
- Products: Financial services
- Number of employees: 304

Home Federal Bank was a financial services company headquartered in Sioux Falls, South Dakota. It operated 27 branch locations in nine communities throughout eastern South Dakota and one community in southwest Minnesota. Also operated as Infinia Bank, a division of Home Federal Bank, located in Bloomington, MN. It was the largest publicly traded savings association based in South Dakota.

Home Federal Bank was acquired by Great Western Bank at the end of 2015 and the entire account portfolio switched on May 16, 2016.

== History ==
Home Federal Bank was originally chartered on March 20, 1929, as Home Federal Savings Association. Since 1992 the organization has operated under a federal savings bank charter with the name, Home Federal Savings Bank. The name changed in 2001 to Home Federal Bank. Home Federal Bank is a wholly owned subsidiary of HF Financial Corp., which is traded on the NASDAQ under the symbol “HFFC.” The home office is located at 225 South Main Avenue, in Sioux Falls, South Dakota. Alerus Financial Corporation (Alerus), based in Grand Forks, North Dakota, and HMNF Financial Inc., based in Rochester, Minnesota, and parent company of Home Federal Savings Bank (Home Federal), announced a merger agreement on May 15, 2024.

== Parent company ==
HF Financial Corp. has assets totaling $987.2 million and stockholders’ equity of $1.2 billion (as of March 31, 2013). The company is the largest publicly traded financial institution based in South Dakota. HF Financial Corp., the parent company for financial service companies, including Home Federal Bank, Mid America Capital Services, Inc., Hometown Insurors, Inc., and HF Financial Group, Inc. The combination of these companies employs over 300 people.

== Recognitions and community involvement ==
Money Magazine recognized Home Federal Bank in its June 1995 issue as South Dakota's Best Bank. The national publication rated the Bank on the attractiveness of its consumer accounts and services, its willingness to lend to its customers and the Bank's safety rating.

Home Federal Bank received an "Outstanding" rating in the Bank's performance relative to the Community Reinvestment Act.

Home Federal Bank, along with Habitat Upper Midwest, was the proud recipient of the "Community Partnership Award" of the Federal Home Loan Bank System in 1999. This is a national award presented to two partnerships in each of the 12 Federal Home Loan Bank areas. A member financial institution and a community-development organization hold each award jointly–partners that have successfully shared the challenge of creating local solutions for specific housing and development problems in their communities. Home Federal has supported numerous Habitat chapters in the creation of 85 South Dakota homes.
