= Pacific Symphony =

Symphony orchestra based in Orange County, California

- Orchestra
- Founded: 1978; 48 years ago
- Location: Orange County, California, U.S.
- Concert hall: Renée and Henry Segerstrom Concert Hall
- Principal conductor: Alexander Shelley
- Website: www.pacificsymphony.org

The Pacific Symphony is a symphony orchestra based in Orange County, California. The orchestra performs at the Renée and Henry Segerstrom Concert Hall as a part of the Segerstrom Center for the Arts in Costa Mesa, California. From 1987 to 2016, the orchestra's Summer Festival concerts took place at the Irvine Meadows Amphitheatre in Irvine, California. Since 2024, the orchestra has held its summer concert series at Great Park in Irvine.

Carl St.Clair served as the orchestra's music director from 1990 to 2025, and currently holds the title of music director Laureate. Alexander Shelley succeeded him as artistic and music director in 2026.

== History ==
=== Keith Clark, music director: 1979–1988 ===
==== Early years ====
Pacific Symphony was founded in 1979 by Keith Clark, who was a former student-assistant conductor of Roger Wagner at the Los Angeles Master Chorale, and the principal guest conductor of the Vienna Chamber Orchestra. Clark began with the orchestra in his home kitchen in Fullerton, California with a grant of $2,000 and personal appeals to local musicians. The musicians who comprised the orchestra were mainly professional freelance musicians from Southern California who performed in the area's movie studios, universities, and other regional performing arts organizations. Many of these musicians were also former concertmasters, associate concertmasters, and players from prominent orchestras, including the Cleveland Orchestra, Detroit Symphony, and Los Angeles Philharmonic. Clark became the orchestra's first music director.

Pacific Symphony's first performance was April 2, 1978, at the Plummer Auditorium in Fullerton, California. By 1981, the orchestra played its concerts at the "Good Time Theater" at Knott's Berry Farm to a fanbase of 3,000 people. In 1983, the orchestra moved its concerts to the Santa Ana High School auditorium, made its first recording, and hired a full-time manager. In the same year, they performed for their first time at the Music Center of Los Angeles County as part of the City of Los Angeles' bicentennial celebrations.

James Chute, in a commentary for The Orange County Register, wrote:

[T]he orchestra's growth continued, as Clark's programs at Santa Ana High School offered an engaging mixture of old and new works, especially American works. The ensemble's recordings of music by Copland, Barber, Ives and Harris were enthusiastically received, while its American music programs attracted large audiences by offering apple pie at intermission and world premieres by respected American composers such as Donald Erb.

==== Financial problems and Clark's ousting ====
In 1986, the orchestra became one of the resident companies at the new Orange County Performing Arts Center and gave its first concerts there in October of that same year. Originally, the center had refused residency to the orchestra, citing elitism from the Pacific Symphony in regards to its membership. However, the Center eventually relented and granted the Pacific Symphony – as well as other regional arts organizations – residency, largely due to Clark's continued lobbying efforts. This move led to a substantial increase in its fanbase, but also a doubling of the orchestra's budget. Consequently, the orchestra soon experienced financial difficulties. This was heightened by their loss of funding from the National Endowment for the Arts.

In June 1987, the orchestra hired Louis Spisto, a marketing director of the Pittsburgh Symphony, as its new executive director. Within months, Clark and Spisto began to clash. Prior to Spisto's arrival, Clark had already developed a difficult reputation with some of the orchestra's board of directors and the orchestra's four prior executive directors, all of whom had resigned after relatively short tenures (one as short as six weeks).

James Chute, writing in The Orange County Register, described the situation:

The standard of a respectable Clark performance seemed to be that he was prepared and that he didn't get lost. Occasionally he went further, as he did most recently in a Jan. 21, 1988 program of Prokofiev's Ivan the Terrible and Mussorgsky's Boris Godunov. But too often, Clark's performances sounded more like readings than interpretations, and sometimes bad readings, such as his Oct. 2, 1986 opening concert in the center, which was drubbed by critics. The opposition to Clark, within the orchestra, according to musicians, has been vociferous but only talked about privately. Most musicians, essentially employed at Clark's pleasure, have no job security in the Pacific Symphony and those who invoked his displeasure have, according to musicians, been pulled arbitrarily from concerts.

In October 1987, Clark signed a one-year contract, giving him a substantial pay raise while also establishing an artistic review process that the board would use to determine the renewal of the contract. By February 1988, Spisto helped to engineer a vote by the orchestra's board on whether or not to renew Clark's contract as music director through the end of his existing contract. In a vote of 12–11, the board voted against retaining Clark; three days later, Clark tendered his resignation, to take effect at the end of the 1988–89 season.

=== Interregnum: 1988–1990 ===
==== Clark's last season ====
Keith Clark continued to conduct the orchestra through its 1988–1989 season. As part of the terms of his resignation, he was given nine months of severance pay and he still maintained the power to hire and fire musicians at his sole discretion. "I will continue as music director in every sense of that word", Clark said.

==== New musician's contract ====
During this time the orchestra and Spisto began a transformational period, with aspirations of attaining world-class status.

The orchestra's first move was to sign the musicians to a traditional orchestra contract, complete with tenure rights in line with typical American Federation of Musicians agreements. While critics frequently assailed Clark's podium leadership, the musicians themselves were given much credit. Establishing tenure helped to give the orchestra a more stable reputation.

"Tenure will put to rest the notion that this is a pick-up orchestra", Spisto said. "It will also give the players a sense of security and a better understanding that they are a major part of our future."

==== Search for a new music director ====
In May 1988, Kazimierz Kord, the then music director of the Warsaw National Philharmonic Orchestra, was named principal guest conductor and music advisor for the 1989–1990 season.

During this time the orchestra also began its search for a permanent music director. Some established conductors, including Lawrence Foster, Sergiu Comissiona, Zdeněk Mácal, and Stuart Challender, were considered along with lesser known names, such as Christopher Seaman, Richard Buckley, Vakhtang Jordania, Toshiyuki Shimada, and Carl St.Clair. Kord repeatedly said that despite his new titled position, he was not a candidate.

The board originally wanted a strong musician that would also be willing to spend significant time with the greater Orange County community. Zdeněk Mácal was considered a front-runner, as he was a resident nearby in Laguna Niguel in addition to being a conductor with a strong resume. However, by that time he already had a number of other positions to his name, and his busy schedule was thought to be a likely deterrent. Mácal pulled himself out of the running before the 1989–90 season began.

In December 1989, the orchestra offered Lawrence Foster– the odds-on favorite – the position of music director. Foster accepted, in principle. Contract negotiations began, and Foster began planning his schedule and the orchestra's programs for the coming years. However, in February 1990, Foster revealed that the offer had been rescinded, largely due to concerns about his salary and level of commitment:

"I gave them a total package", Foster said. "I was given to understand that the board regarded it as too exorbitant." ... "I am brokenhearted", he added. "From the very beginning I became extremely excited about the project... But that is their right. It is their organization. I can't do anything about it." ... Besides the salary issue, Foster said, "There was some distrust about my commitment to building the orchestra, that I am regarded as a European person and would not be sufficiently committed here." "I think they wanted more time, but it was impossible with my family commitments and my other activities", Foster said. "And I told them I wasn't able to move to Orange County. With my work in Europe, that would have been impossible. But my wife and I had gotten so excited about the possibility that we were considering moving back to the United States in a couple of years, to New York, so we could be midway between Southern California and Europe."

The news of the orchestra's decision to pull Foster's offer came on the heels of Carl St.Clair's debut with the orchestra on January 31 and February 1. By all accounts, the concerts went well; despite changes in programs, concert soloists, and concertmasters, his conducting was well received by musicians, board, and audience alike. Moreover, he had indicated a willingness to move to Orange County and seemed enthusiastic about being a part of the county's burgeoning arts and cultural scene.

On February 26, 1990, the orchestra named Carl St.Clair as its second music director, effective October 1 of that year.

=== Carl St.Clair, music director: 1990–2025 ===
Carl St.Clair served as music director of the symphony for over three decades. In 2013–14, the symphony launched the music festival //Wavelength//, blending contemporary music and symphony musicians in unique collaborations.

St.Clair led the orchestra's historic 2006/2007 move into its home in the Renée and Henry Segerstrom Concert Hall at Segerstrom Center for the Arts. The move came on the heels of the landmark 2005–06 season that included St.Clair leading the symphony on its first European tour—nine cities in three countries playing before capacity houses and receiving extraordinary responses and reviews.

From 2008 to 2010, St.Clair was general music director for the Komische Oper Berlin, where he led successful new productions such as La traviata (directed by Hans Neuenfels). He also served as general music director and chief conductor of the Deutsches Nationaltheater und Staatskapelle Weimar in Weimar, Germany, where he led Wagner's Ring Cycle to critical acclaim. He was the first non-European to hold this position at that theatre; the role also gave him the distinction of simultaneously leading one of the newest orchestras in America and one of the oldest in Europe.

In 2014, St.Clair became music director of the National Symphony Orchestra in Costa Rica. He was the principal guest conductor of the Stuttgart Radio Symphony Orchestra from 1998 to 2004, where he completed a three–year recording project of the Villa–Lobos symphonies. He has also appeared with orchestras in Israel, Hong Kong, Japan, Australia, New Zealand and South America, and summer festivals worldwide.

In North America, St.Clair has led the Boston Symphony Orchestra, (where he served as assistant conductor for several years), New York Philharmonic, Philadelphia Orchestra, Los Angeles Philharmonic and the San Francisco, Seattle, Detroit, Atlanta, Houston, Indianapolis, Montreal, Toronto and Vancouver symphonies.

2024/2025 marks St.Clair's 35th season with Pacific Symphony, making him the longest serving American-born music director of an American orchestra. In November 2024, English conductor Alexander Shelley was announced as St.Clair's successor, sharing the 2025/26 season with St.Clair, and assuming full artistic leadership for the 2026/27 season.

== New music ==
Pacific Symphony focuses on developing and promoting both young and established composers while expanding the orchestral repertoire. Its focus on new works is illustrated by the symphony's commissions and recordings, as well as in-depth explorations of American artists and themes at the American Composer Festival and the Young American Composers Competition.

== Recordings ==
The 2013–14 season saw the continuation of a recent slate of recordings that began with two newly released compact discs in 2012–13 featuring two of today's leading composers, Philip Glass' The Passion of Ramakrishna and Michael Daugherty's Mount Rushmore, both the result of works commissioned and performed by the symphony, with three more recordings due to be released over the next few years. These feature the music of symphony-commissioned works by William Bolcom, Songs of Lorca and Prometheus, James Newton Howard's I Would Plant a Tree and Richard Danielpour's Toward a Season of Peace. The symphony has also commissioned and recorded An American Requiem (2001) by Danielpour, and Elliot Goldenthal's Fire Water Paper: A Vietnam Oratorio with Yo-Yo Ma. Other recordings have included collaborations with such composers as Lucas Foss and Tōru Takemitsu. It has also commissioned such composers as Paul Chihara, Daniel Catán, William Kraft, Ana Lara, Tobias Picker, Christopher Theofanidis, Frank Ticheli and Chen Yi.

== Symphonic Voices ==
Symphonic Voices, an initiative to reintroduce opera to Orange County, was inspired by St.Clair's career as an opera conductor in Europe. The initiative began with the successful debut of a concert production of Puccini's La bohème in 2012, followed by Puccini's Tosca in 2013; in 2014, with Verdi's La traviata, and in 2015 with Bizet's Carmen. The entire orchestra is usually present onstage during these productions, which have featured the Pacific Chorale and opera stars.

== Education and community engagement ==
Pacific Symphony provides various education programs. The orchestra's Class Act residency program has been honored as one of nine exemplary orchestra education programs in the nation by the National Endowment for the Arts and the American Symphony Orchestra League.

In addition to the Pacific Symphony Youth Orchestra, in 2007–08, St.Clair added to the list of programs the Pacific Symphony Youth Wind Ensemble and Pacific Symphony Santiago Strings, and in the summer of 2012, added the Santa Ana Strings. The Pacific Symphony Youth Concert Band was launched in 2022. Other community engagement programs include arts-X-press, OC Can You Play With Us, and Strings for Generations.

== Music directors ==
- 1979–1988: Keith Clark
- 1990–2025: Carl St.Clair
- 2026: Alexander Shelley

=== Principal pops conductors ===
- 1989–1990: Doc Severinsen
- 1991–2023: Richard Kaufman
- 2023–present: Enrico Lopez-Yañez

=== Principal guest conductors ===
- 1989–1990: Kazimierz Kord

=== Assistant/associate conductors ===
- 1999-2005* Mark Mandarano
- 2002–2008: Michael Hall
- 2009–2012: Maxim Eshkenazy
- 2012–2015: Alejandro Gutierrez
- 2015–2020: Roger Kalia
- 2020–2025: Jacob Sustaita
- 2025–2026: Pola Benke
- 2026–present: Moon Doh
