= H. F. Ahmanson & Co. =

American bank holding company

- Type: Public
- Traded as: NYSE: AHM
- Industry: Financial services
- Founded: 1927; 99 years ago
- Founder: Howard F. Ahmanson
- Defunct: October 1, 1998; 28 years ago
- Fate: Acquired by Washington Mutual
- Successor: Washington Mutual, later JPMorgan Chase
- Headquarters: 4900 Rivergrade Road, Irwindale, California, U.S.
- Key people: Howard F. Ahmanson (CEO, 1927–1968); William H. Ahmanson (CEO, 1969–1983); Richard H. Deihl (CEO & Chairman, 1983)
- Total assets: US$53 billion (1995)
- Total equity: US$198.8 million (1995)
- Number of employees: 10,754 (1997)
- Subsidiaries: Home Savings of America; Savings of America; Ahmanson Mortgage Company; Ahmanson Marketing, Inc.; Griffin Financial Services

H.F. Ahmanson & Co. was a California holding company named after Howard F. Ahmanson Sr. It was best known as the parent of Home Savings of America, once one of the largest savings and loan associations in the United States.

== Early history ==
Howard Fieldstad Ahmanson, the company's founder, was born in Omaha, Nebraska on July 1, 1906.

Considered by his father to be a genius by the age of five, Ahmanson founded the H.F. Ahmanson company in 1927, before graduating from the University of Southern California. Ahmanson's company specialized in casualty insurance and quickly became the largest underwriter in California. During the Great Depression, the company prospered by dealing with foreclosures. Ahmanson once remarked that he felt like an undertaker: "the worse it got, the better it was for me."

In 1943, Ahmanson bought control of Omaha-based National American Insurance Company. His father had previously owned National American, but the Ahmanson family had lost control of it after his father's death in 1925.

== Post World War II era & 1950s ==
After World War II, the American housing market expanded tremendously, especially in California. In 1947, Ahmanson purchased the Home Building and Loan Association, a savings and loan association with assets of less than $1 million, for $162,000. Home Savings then became the cornerstone of H.F. Ahmanson & Company. In the decade that followed, Ahmanson acquired 18 additional institutions, merged them under the name Home Savings and Loan, and turned the group into a financial giant.

Prior to the 1950s, mortgage lenders often earned extra income by tying fire insurance policies to mortgages. New laws passed by states in the late 1940s began to limit this tying relationship. The U.S. Department of Justice's antitrust division launched an investigation of H.F. Ahmanson in the mid-1950s, but the investigation was dropped.

H.F. Ahmanson also formed the Ahmanson Bank and Trust Company in 1957, the National American Title Insurance Company in 1958, and the National American Life Insurance Company of California in 1961.

== 1960s ==
H.F Ahmanson continued to grow at a furious pace until the 1960s, when the housing market began to falter and the federal government began to pass legislation designed to regulate the savings and loan industry. In 1965, the Ahmanson Company shifted its mortgage emphasis from tract housing to apartment buildings and was able to avoid most of the problems that other savings institutions faced. Howard Ahmanson viewed the collapse as good for the industry because homes were being built too quickly. Ahmanson likened this industry-wide correction to "a good laxative that cleaned out the system when it could afford to be cleaned."

On June 17, 1968, while traveling in Belgium with his second wife Caroline Leonetti Ahmanson and his son, Howard Ahmanson suffered a heart attack and died. Fortune Magazine estimated Ahmanson's financial worth at the time at between $200 and $300 million, most of it controlled by trust funds and foundations. The Ahmanson company was known for being quiet regarding its operations.

Ahmanson's nephew, William H. Ahmanson, succeeded him as head of the then-private corporation, while Richard Deihl continued as CEO of Home Savings and Loan. After Howard Ahmanson's death, the company's reputation for conservative and shrewd management continued, as did its ability to weather downswings in the economy.

The Tax Reform Act of 1969, which called for a reduction of concentrated holdings by foundations, resulted in several stock offerings by H.F. Ahmanson, but the company's financial base was so solid that the sales had minimal effect. A $101 million stock offering in 1972 was a record for the time, yet it only represented 6.4% of the firm's $4.4 billion in assets. After the Bank Holding Company Act of 1970, H.F. Ahmanson was forced to sell the Ahmanson Bank, which it did in 1976 to private Philippine investors. However, Ahmanson was able to retain its trust operations as a subsidiary, Ahmanson Trust Company.

In the 1960s, there was intense competition among savings and loan associations centered around very high interest rates and offers of expensive premium items for customers who opened new accounts. In 1966, legislation ended the so-called "rates wars," leaving institutions to rely on advertising to attract new customers. Not surprisingly, the larger institutions with more advertising dollars to spend prospered and the giants, including Home Savings, gained the power to set loan interest rates.

== 1970s ==
The late 1960s and early 1970s were lean years for the savings and loan industry. A frantic building spree had led to many foreclosures in California and money was tight. Out-of-state money had poured into California because interest rates there were much higher than in the rest of the nation, but as other states began to match California's rates, the money was withdrawn.

By the latter part of the 1970s, investors were beginning to put their money in California institutions again, but in general at this time people were spending more and saving less than past generations. Savings and loans began to look for alternative ways to make money, through consumer lending (such as appliance financing) and loans on properties other than single-family homes. Ahmanson had foreseen these difficulties and had been making loans on apartment buildings since 1965 as a cushion against the failing mortgage market. But Ahmanson did not diversify to the point that would cause the failure of many thrift institutions in the years to come—even into the 1990s the company still did not make auto or consumer loans, leases, or unsecured commercial loans, which tend to be riskier.

Several federal regulations passed during this period proved advantageous to H.F. Ahmanson & Company. A 1968 law ended a nine-year freeze on takeovers by holding companies, and a 1971 rule allowed financial institutions to make loans within 200 miles of each branch office—whereas the old rule had restricted lending to within 200 miles of an institution's headquarters only. Spurred by the easing of restrictions, the Home Savings network soon covered the whole state of California, as four offices were acquired in northern California.

Ahmanson's insurance operations, the original business of the company, continued to grow, as Stuyvesant Insurance Group was acquired from GAC Corporation in 1974 and Bankers National Life Insurance Company was purchased in 1981.

== 1980s ==
Having saturated the California savings and loan market, Ahmanson began to merge out-of-state institutions into the Home Savings network under the name Savings of America. In December 1981, three mergers were completed in Florida and Missouri; six more in Texas and Illinois followed in 1982. A New York merger was completed in 1984. Subsequent mergers included institutions in Ohio (1985), Arizona (1987), and Washington (1987). At the end of 1987, Home Savings reported $27 billion in assets.

These forays outside California often included expensive, and very successful, direct-mail campaigns. One promotion in Texas reportedly brought in $60 million in one month. But Ahmanson's interstate mergers have also generated some opposition. When Savings of America announced plans to open an office in Berwyn, Illinois, a community known for its proliferation of financial institutions, critics in the industry questioned Ahmanson's motives. An earlier protest to the Federal Home Loan Bank by Illinois officials had been dropped after the company convinced the protesters that Illinois money would not be used for California investments. In any event, as one official said, protests rarely affect regulatory approvals, and the Savings of America branches continue to attract savers by offering interest rates as much as 2% higher than local competitors.

Further penetration outside California continued when, in January 1988, Ahmanson acquired the Bowery Savings Bank, an institution established in 1934 in New York City. The 25 Bowery offices continue to operate under their original name.

Ahmanson also strengthened its loan operations in the 1980s by opening lending offices under the name of Ahmanson Mortgage Company in Colorado, Connecticut, Georgia, Maryland, Washington, D.C., Massachusetts, Minnesota, North Carolina, Oregon, Tennessee, and Virginia. Two regional loan service centers, in California and North Carolina, provided support for the offices.

Richard H. Deihl became chairman and CEO of H.F. Ahmanson in 1983. A company veteran, he joined Home Savings as a loan agent in 1960 and was elected CEO of the subsidiary in 1967. Under Deihl's leadership, Ahmanson company avoided the high returns from junk bonds during the mid-1980s, preferring to rely on the safer 1% to 1.5% earnings garnered from a home loan. It was a prescient decision. From 1988 to 1990, when hundreds of savings and loans throughout the United States were failing because of their involvement with junk bonds, Ahmanson's deposits grew by 75% and its assets increased by more than 65%. The company's net earnings during the same period averaged more than $200 million per year.

Part of Deihl's success was due to his strategy of streamlining Ahmanson's operating costs. First, the company moved its headquarters to Irwindale, California to take advantage of more space for less money. Second, more than 700 employees were eliminated at staff and administrative levels. As a result, the company lowered its ratio of general expenses to 1.5% of its average assets, nearly one-half point below the industry ratio for the larger savings and loan institutions. Deihl insisted on strict criteria for home loans. The average borrower at Home Savings carried a personal debt of 33% of his total income, almost 3% below the standard set by the Government National Mortgage Association. In 1991, approximately 95% of the company's entire loan portfolio was secured by residential real estate properties.

== 1990s ==
In light of such favorable numbers, Ahmanson continued to expand by purchasing other savings and loans that were failing. In 1990 and the following year, the company purchased Home Savings Bank of New York and also acquired numerous branch offices from Coast Savings' San Diego operation. In 1992, Ahmanson acquired County Bank of Santa Barbara and also changed the names of its savings and loan operations in New York and Connecticut to Home Savings of America. In 1993, the company purchased 24 branch offices from HomeFed Bank. In July, 1994, Home Savings of America purchased Fidelity Federal Bank, Long Beach Bank and Hawthorne Savings and Loan Association, with a total of 21 branches in Southern California with deposits totaling $1.1 billion. In addition, Home Savings of America purchased five branches of Guardian Federal Savings Association of Huntington Beach and four branches of Northeast Savings in San Diego from the Resolution Trust Corp (RTC) in the same month. Two months later in September 1994, Home Savings of America purchased 23 branches of Western Federal Savings Bank from the RTC.

Yet even with this expansion Ahmanson felt the effects of California's recession during the early 1990s. In 1992, earnings fell to $156 million, partially due to falling property values in the state which led to a substantial increase in non-performing assets. During the same year, 61% of its mortgage business resulted from refinancings.

Prior to 1998 the principal Subsidiaries were Home Savings of America; Savings of America; Ahmanson Mortgage Company; Ahmanson Marketing, Inc.; Griffin Financial Services.

In 1998, Seattle-based thrift Washington Mutual (WaMu) purchased HF Ahmanson and its Home Savings unit for $10 billion. As a result of this takeover and those of American Savings and Great Western Financial, Washington Mutual became California's second largest bank. At the time, HF Ahmanson had $55 billion in assets.

The acquisition also gave Washington Mutual control over a part of the Ahmanson Ranch, a hotly disputed undeveloped area northwest of Los Angeles. After initial considerations of developing a new city on the large space, WaMu eventually sold off their share, now known as the Upper Las Virgenes Canyon Open Space Preserve.

With the collapse of Washington Mutual in 2008, JPMorgan Chase has become the successor to H. F. Ahmanson and Co.

== Home Savings ==
=== Expansion in California ===
In January 1991, Home Savings announced the pending acquisition of 19 San Diego-area branch offices of the Los Angeles–based Coast Federal Bank for $20 million in cash. The acquisition was completed in May 1991. Five of the acquired branch offices were closed and consolidated into nearby Home Savings offices.

In March 1992, Home Savings announced the acquisition of 10 branch offices of the failed Santa Barbara–based County Bank from the Resolution Trust Corporation for an undisclosed amount.

In August 1992, Home Savings announced the pending acquisition of 8 Central Valley-area branch offices of the Coast Federal Bank for an undisclosed amount. The acquisition was completed in November 1992.

In December 1993, Home Savings announced the acquisition of 8 Inland Empire-area branch offices of the failed San Diego–based HomeFed Bank from the Resolution Trust Corporation for an undisclosed amount.

In March 1994, Home Savings announced the pending acquisition of the four California branch offices of the Connecticut-based Northeast Savings for an undisclosed amount. Three of the offices were closed and the deposits from those offices were transferred to nearby Home Savings offices. The acquisition was completed in July 1994.

In July 1994, Home Savings announced the pending acquisition of two branch offices and the deposits of the remaining four branch office of the Orange-based Long Beach Bank for $12.5 million in cash. The acquisition was completed in October 1994. After the sale, Long Beach Bank converted from a savings bank to a mortgage banking company that specialized in subprime mortgages and changed the name of the company to Long Beach Mortgage Company. Long Beach Mortgage was later acquired by Washington Mutual in 1999. During the same month, Home Savings announced the pending acquisition of the deposits of nine branch offices of the troubled Glendale-based Fidelity Federal Bank for an undisclosed amount and six branch offices of the Hawthorne Savings & Loan for an undisclosed amount in an unrelated sale. The Fidelity transaction was completed in August. Home Savings also acquired five branches of the Huntington Beach-based Guardian Federal Savings Association from the Resolution Trust Corporation for $1.8 million.

In September 1994, Home Savings announced the acquisition of 23 branch offices of the failed Marina del Rey–based Western Federal Savings Bank from the Resolution Trust Corporation for $87.2 million.

In February 1995, Home Savings announced the pending acquisition of 52 Southern California branches of Household Bank from Household International for $53 million in cash. Home Savings had planned to close 20 branches that were in close proximity to existing Home Savings offices. The acquisition was completed in June 1995.

In March 1996, Home Savings announced the pending acquisition of 61 First Interstate Bancorp branch offices for about $200 million that Wells Fargo was required to sell by the U.S. Department of Justice before Wells Fargo could acquire First Interstate. As a result of close proximity to an existing Home Savings branch office, the first 14 out of a possible 27 First Interstate Bank branches were announced in June to be closed.

In October 1997, Home Savings announced the pending acquisition of the Los Angeles–based Coast Savings Financial, Inc., with its Coast Federal Bank subsidiary for $900 million in stock. At the time of the announcement, Coast had 90 branch offices in California while Home had 370 branch offices in California, Texas, and Florida. The acquisition was completed in February 1998. After closing 52 redundant branch offices in California and selling off the remaining branch offices in Florida in an unrelated sale, Home Savings had approximately 375 branch offices remaining in California and Texas by mid-1998.

The merger of Coast with Home Savings (and not to mention the subsequent acquisition of Home by Washington Mutual that occurred just a few months later) did not occur without problems for customers. One customer discovered that records for her two adjustable-rate mortgages could not be located for an entire month. A Home Savings customer discovered that the bank lost his safety deposit box, which contained irreplaceable family heirlooms, during the branch office consolidations. Other customers complained about long lines and erosion of the quality of customer service as a result of branch consolidations.

=== Expansion in Florida ===
In February 1997, H. F. Ahmanson announced the pending sale of 12 branch offices in Florida to the Birmingham, Alabama–based SouthTrust for an undisclosed amount. At time of the announcement, Home Savings had 39 branch offices in Florida. In December 1997, H. F. Ahmanson announced the pending sale of the remaining 27 branch offices in Florida to SouthTrust for $300 million in cash.

=== Expansion in New York ===
In August 1984, Home Savings entered the state of New York by announcing the Federal Savings and Loan Insurance Corporation-assisted acquisition of the troubled Cedarhurst-based Century Federal Savings and Loan Association. At the time of the acquisition, Century Federal Savings had 16 branches on Long Island.

In October 1987, Home Savings announced the pending acquisition of the troubled New York City–based Bowery Savings Bank with its 25 New York City branches for $200 million in cash. The acquisition was completed in February 1988 and initially did not merger Bowery into its existing Savings of America's New York operations and kept it as a separate business entity.

In April 1990, Home Savings announced the pending acquisition of the Bayside-based Home Savings Bank of New York with its 13 branch offices for $300 million in stock. At time of the announcement, Home had 26 branch offices operating as Bowery Savings Bank in the New York City metropolitan area and 18 branch offices in Long Island and New York City operating as Savings of America. The acquisition was completed in November 1990.

In April 1992, Home Savings announced that they were changing the names of all of its branch offices to the Home Savings of America name. Previous to that announcement, Home Savings was doing business in the state of New York under the names of Bowery Savings Bank, Home Savings Bank, and Savings of America.

In May 1993, Home Savings announced the pending acquisition of 10 branch offices of the Syosset-based Long Island Savings Bank for an undisclosed amount.

In May 1995, Home Savings announced the pending sale of its entire New York state system of 60 branch offices to the New York City–based GreenPoint Financial Corporation for $660 million, a price 1.5 times what some analysts had expected the system to fetch. At the time of the sale, Home Savings had branch offices in New York City, Long Island, and Westchester County just prior to leaving the state.

=== Expansion in Arizona ===
In April 1987, Home Savings entered Arizona by announcing the pending acquisition of the one-office Tucson-based Tucson Savings & Loan Association for an undisclosed amount of Ahmanson stock.

In August 1996, Home Savings decided to leave the state of Arizona by announcing the pending sale of all 4 branch offices in Arizona to the First National Bank of Arizona, then a unit of Bancorp Hawaii for an undisclosed amount. The acquisition was completed in March 1997.
