= List of compositions by Philip Glass =

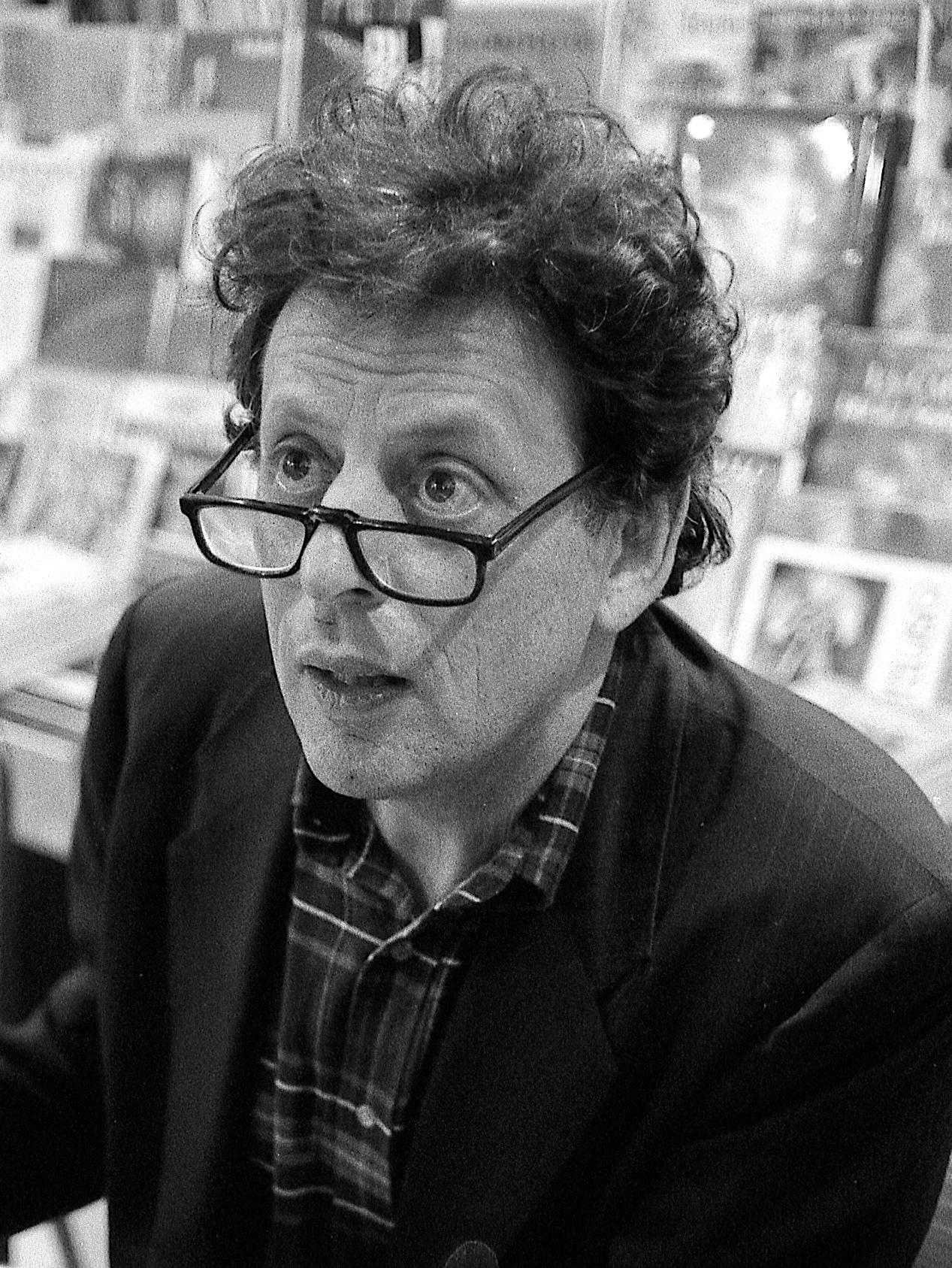
Philip Glass in 1993

The following is a list of compositions by Philip Glass.

== Works for the Philip Glass Ensemble ==
- 600 Lines (1967)
- How Now for ensemble (also for piano, 1968)
- Music in Fifths (1969)
- Music in Similar Motion (1969)
- Music with Changing Parts (released on LP in 1971)
- Music in Twelve Parts (1971–1974)
- Another Look at Harmony, Parts 1 and 2 (1975)
- North Star (1977)
- Dance (Dance 1, 3 and 5, 1979, with Lucinda Childs and Sol LeWitt)
- Glassworks (1981)
- A Descent into the Maelstrom (based on the short story by Edgar Allan Poe, 1985)
- Orion (2004)
- Los Paisajes del Rio (2008)

== Operas ==
- Einstein on the Beach for the Philip Glass Ensemble (1975–1976, with Robert Wilson)
- Satyagraha (1978–1979, premiered in 1980, libretto by Constance DeJong)
- Akhnaten (1983, libretto by Philip Glass and Shalom Goldman)
- The Civil Wars: A Tree Is Best Measured When It Is Down, Act V – The Rome Section (1983, with Robert Wilson, libretto by Robert Wilson and Maita di Niscemi, including texts by Seneca the Younger)
- The Making of the Representative for Planet 8 (1985–1986, premiered in 1988, libretto by Doris Lessing, after her fourth novel from Canopus in Argos)
- The Voyage (1990, premiered in 1992, libretto by David Henry Hwang)
- White Raven (1991, premiered as O Corvo Branco in 1998, with Robert Wilson, libretto by Luísa Costa Gomes)
- The Marriages Between Zones Three, Four, and Five (1997, libretto by Doris Lessing, after her second novel from Canopus in Argos)
- Galileo Galilei (2002, libretto by Mary Zimmerman and Arnold Weinstein)
- Waiting for the Barbarians for voices, chorus and orchestra (2005, after the novel by J. M. Coetzee)
- Appomattox (2007, libretto by Christopher Hampton)
- Kepler (2009, libretto by Martina Winkel, including texts by Johannes Kepler and Andreas Gryphius)
- The Perfect American (2011, based on the book about Walt Disney by Peter Stephan Jungk, premiered at the Teatro Real, Madrid, on January 22, 2013)
- Spuren der Verirrten (The Lost) (2013, Libretto in German adapted by Rainer Mennicken after the play Spuren der Verirrten by Peter Handke, premiered 12 April 2013 at the Musiktheater Linz, Austria)
- Circus Days and Nights (2021. Librettists David Henry Hwang and circus director Tilde Björfors based on a collection of poems by American poet Robert Lax. Premiered on Malmö Opera's main stage with live music to a live audience and livestreamed worldwide May 29, 2021, thru June 13, 2021.)

== Chamber operas, music theatre ==
- A Madrigal Opera for six voices, violin and viola (1980)
- The Photographer for soloists, chorus and orchestra (1982, based on the life of Eadweard Muybridge)
- The Juniper Tree (1984, with Robert Moran, libretto by Arthur Yorinks)
- The Fall of the House of Usher (libretto by Arthur Yorinks after the short story by Edgar Allan Poe, 1987)
- 1000 Airplanes on the Roof for voice and ensemble (text by David Henry Hwang, 1988)
- Hydrogen Jukebox for voices and ensemble (libretto by Allen Ginsberg, 1990)
- Orphée for voices and chamber orchestra (1991, after the film by Jean Cocteau and premiered in 1993)
- La Belle et la Bête for voices and the Philip Glass Ensemble or chamber orchestra (1994, after the film by Jean Cocteau)
- Les Enfants terribles (1996), Dance Opera for voices and three pianos (1996, after Jean Cocteau's 1929 novel and the 1950 film by Jean-Pierre Melville)
- The Witches of Venice, children's opera-ballet (1997)
- Monsters of Grace, chamber opera for the Philip Glass Ensemble (1998, with 3D digital footage directed by Robert Wilson, libretto from works of Jalaluddin Rumi)
- In the Penal Colony for voices and string quintet (2000, libretto after the short story by Franz Kafka)
- The Sound of a Voice for voices and chamber ensemble including a pipa (2003, libretto by David Henry Hwang)
- The Trial (2014, for voices and chamber orchestra; libretto by Christopher Hampton, based on the novel by Franz Kafka)

== Works for solo piano or electric organ ==
- How Now for piano or electric organ (1968)
- Two Pages for piano or electric organ (1968)
- Music in Contrary Motion for electric organ (1969)
- Another Look at Harmony, Part 3 for electric organ (1975)
- Knee Play 4 for piano (1975, from Einstein on the Beach)
- Modern Love Waltz for piano (piano version of Fourth Series, Part Three, 1978)
- Mad Rush for piano or electric organ (originally Fourth Series, Part Four, 1979)
- Opening for piano (1981, from Glassworks)
- The Olympian for piano (1984)
- Cadenza for Mozart's Piano Concerto No. 21 (K. 467, 1786) (1987)
- Wichita Vortex Sutra for piano (1988, later included in Hydrogen Jukebox)
- Metamorphosis for piano (1988, see album Solo Piano)
- The French Lieutenant Sleeps from The Screens for piano (1989)
- Night on the Balcony from The Screens for piano (or harpsichord, 1989)
- Tesra for piano (1993)
- 12 Pieces for Ballet for piano (1993)
- Etudes for piano, Volume 1 (1994 and earlier)
- The Joyful Moment for piano (1998)
- Truman Sleeps (1998, from the film The Truman Show)
- Dreaming Awake for piano (2003, written and recorded by Glass as a benefit for Jewel Heart)
- A Musical Portrait of Chuck Close, two movements for piano (2005, Etudes 11 and 12 of Volume 2)
- Etudes for piano, Volume 2 (1994 and 2012)
- Distant Figure – Passacaglia (2017)
- Piano Sonata (2019)
- Prelude for Organ (2025)

== Works for solo piano, arranged by others from various sources ==
- Trilogy Sonata for piano (1975/1979/1983, from Einstein, Sathyagraha and Akhnaten, arranged by Paul Barnes in 2001)
- Closing from "Mishima" for piano (1984, transcribed by Michael Riesman)
- Anima Mundi for piano (1991, transcribed by Michael Riesman)
- Selections from "A Brief History of Time" for piano (1991, transcribed by Michael Riesman)
- The Orphée Suite for piano (1991, transcribed by Paul Barnes in 2000)
- Candyman: Helen's Theme and more for piano (1992, transcribed by Michael Riesman)
- Overture from La Belle et la Bête for piano (1994, transcribed by Michael Riesman)
- Jenipapo: No. 14 for piano (1995, transcribed by Michael Riesman)
- Epilogue from Monsters of Grace for piano (1998, transcribed by Paul Barnes in 2001)
- Dracula for piano (1998, transcribed by Michael Riesman in 2007)
- Naqoyqatsi: Primacy of Number for piano (2002, transcribed by Michael Riesman)
- The Fog of War for piano (2002, transcribed by Michael Riesman)
- Music from the Hours for piano (2002/2003, transcribed by Michael Riesman and Nico Muhly)
- Concerto No. 2 "After Lewis and Clark" for piano (2004, transcribed by Paul Barnes)
- Neverwas Set for piano (2005, transcribed by Michael Riesman)
- "Life in the Mountains" from "The Illusionist" for piano (2006, transcribed by Michael Riesman)
- Notes on a Scandal: I knew her for piano (2006, transcribed by Michael Riesman)
- No Reservations Combine for piano (2007, transcribed by Michael Riesman)
- Prophecies from Koyaanisqatsi for piano (2015, transcribed by Anton Batagov)

== Works for two or more pianos ==
- In Again Out Again for two pianos (1967)
- Six Scenes from Les Enfants Terribles for two pianos (1996, transcribed by Maki Namekawa and Dennis Russell Davies)
- Four Movements for Two Pianos (2008)
- Two Movements for Four Pianos (2013)

== String quartets ==
- String Quartet No. 1 (1966)
- String Quartet No. 2 Company (1984, composed for a dramatization of Samuel Beckett's novella)
- String Quartet No. 3 Mishima (1985)
- String Quartet No. 4 Buczak (1989, dedicated to Brian Buczak and commissioned by Geoffrey Hendricks)
- String Quartet No. 5 (1991)
- Bent for String Quartet (1997)
- Dracula for string quartet (or piano and string quartet) (1998, music for the 1931 film)
- String Quartet No. 6 (2013)
- String Quartet No. 7 (2014)
- String Quartet No. 8 (2018)
- King Lear (music for the Broadway production) (2019)
- String Quartet No. 9 King Lear (2022)

== Chamber music (other than string quartets) ==
- Brass Sextet (1962–1964)
- Play for two saxophones (1965, music for Samuel Beckett's play)
- Music for Ensemble and Two Actresses for wind sextet and two speakers (1965)
- Head On for violin, cello and piano (1967)
- Music in the Shape of a Square for two flutes (1967)
- Two Down for two saxophones (1967)
- Best Out of Three for three clarinets (1968)
- Music in Eight Parts for two soprano saxophones, viola, cello and three electric organs (1969)
- Fourth Series Part Three for violin and clarinet (1978)
- Opening from Glassworks for piano, cello and percussion (1981)
- Façades, for two saxophones (or flute and clarinet) and string ensemble (1981)
- Prelude to Endgame for timpani and double bass (1984, for the play by Samuel Beckett)
- Music from The Screens for chamber ensemble (1989/1991, from a collaboration with Foday Musa Suso)
- Passages for chamber ensemble (1990, from a collaboration with Ravi Shankar)
- The Orchard (from The Screens) for cello and piano (plus optional percussion) (1989)
- Love Divided By for flute and piano (1992)
- In the Summer House for violin and cello (1993, music for the play by Jane Bowles)
- Saxophone Quartet (1995; also orchestral version, see § For multiple soloists)
- Tissues (from Naqoyqatsi) for cello, percussion and piano (2002)
- Taoist Sacred Dance for piano and flute (2003)
- Music from The Sound of a Voice for flute, pipa, violin, cello and percussion (2003)
- Sonata for Violin and Piano (2008)
- Duo for Viola & Percussion (2009)
- Pendulum, movement for violin and piano (2010)
- Duos for violin and cello (2010–11, arranged from Double Concerto for Violin and Cello)
- Annunciation, piano quintet for two violins, viola, cello, and piano (2018)
- Perpetulum, percussion quartet (2019)

== Chamber music (other than string quartets), arranged by others ==
- The Windcatcher for saxophone sextet (1992/2002, arranged from 'Love Divided By' by Nico Muhly)
- String Sextet (1995/2009, adapted from Symphony No.3 by Michael Riesman)

== Works for solo instruments (other than piano) ==
- Strung Out for amplified violin (1967)
- Gradus for soprano saxophone (1968)
- Arabesque in Memoriam for flute (1988)
- France from The Screens for violin (1989)
- Melodies for saxophone (1995)
- Songs and Poems No. 1 for Solo Cello (2005–2007)
- Songs and Poems No. 2 for Solo Cello (2010)
- Partita for Solo Violin (2010–2011)
- Orbit for solo cello, for Yo-Yo Ma and Lil Buck, April 2, 2013, (Le) Poisson Rouge, Manhattan
- Partita for Solo Double Bass (The Not Doings of an Insomniac) (2015)

== Symphonies ==
- Symphony No. 1 (1992) based on Low by David Bowie
- Symphony No. 2 (1994)
- Symphony No. 3 (1995) for string orchestra
- Symphony No. 4 (1996) based on "Heroes" by David Bowie
- Symphony No. 5 (1999) Requiem, Bardo, Nirmanakaya for soloists, chorus and orchestra
- Symphony No. 6 (2002) Plutonian Ode for soprano and orchestra
- Symphony No. 7 (2005) Toltec for chorus and orchestra
- Symphony No. 8 (2005)
- Symphony No. 9 (2011)
- Symphony No. 10 (2012)
- Symphony No. 11 (2017)
- Symphony No. 12 (2019) based on Lodger by David Bowie
- Symphony No. 13 (2022)
- Symphony No. 14 (2021) Liechtenstein Suite for string orchestra
- Symphony No. 15 (2026) Lincoln

== Other works for orchestra ==
- Piece for Chamber Orchestra (1965)
- Music in Similar Motion for chamber orchestra (1969, orch. in 1981)
- Company for string orchestra (1983; orchestral version of String Quartet No. 2 Company (1983), see String quartets)
- Glass Pieces for orchestra (1983, orchestral versions of "Funeral" from Akhnaten and Floe and Façades, for Jerome Robbins' ballet)
- Prelude and Dance from Akhnaten for orchestra (1983)
- the CIVIL warS – the Cologne Section for orchestra with optional mixed chorus (1984)
- Two Interludes from the CIVIL warS – the Rome Section for orchestra (1984)
- Runaway Horses from Mishima for string orchestra and harp (1985)
- In the Upper Room for chamber orchestra (1986, music for Twyla Tharp's dance piece)
- Phaedra for string orchestra and percussion (1986)
- The Light, a Symphonic Portrait for orchestra (1987)
- The Canyon, a Dramatic Episode for orchestra (1988)
- Passages for chamber orchestra (1990, a collaboration with Ravi Shankar)
- Mechanical Ballet from The Voyage for orchestra (1990)
- Suite from Orphée for chamber orchestra (1991, compiled by The Knights in 2013)
- Concerto Grosso for chamber orchestra (1992)
- Three Pieces from The Secret Agent for orchestra (1995)
- Days and Nights in Rocinha, Dance for orchestra (1997)
- DRA Fanfare for orchestra (1999)
- Dancissimo for orchestra (2001)
- Icarus at the Edge of Time for narrator and orchestra (2010)
- Harmonium Mountain for orchestra (2011)
- Black and White Scherzo for orchestra (2011, movement 6 of Symphony No.10)
- Overture 2012 for orchestra (2012)
- King Lear Overture for orchestra (2019)
- Alice ballet for orchestra (2022)
- Triumph of the Octagon for orchestra (2023)

== Works for orchestra, orchestrated by others ==
- Modern Love Waltz for chamber orchestra (1978, orch. by Robert Moran in 1979)
- The Thin Blue Line for string orchestra (1988, arr. by Michael Riesman)
- Overture to La Belle et la Bête for string orchestra and piano (1994, arr. by Michael Riesman)
- Life: A Journey Through Time in seven sections for orchestra (2006, orch. by Michael Riesman, from The Secret Agent, Les Enfants Terribles, Dracula and other works, for the visuals by Frans Lanting)
- Overture from La Belle et la Bête for string orchestra (2007, arr. by Viktor Kopytko)
- Four Pieces from "Dracula" for string orchestra and piano (2007, arr. by Viktor Kopytko)

== Other works for orchestra, with chorus and solo voices ==
- Koyaanisqatsi: Life out of balance for chorus, ensemble and orchestra (1982, performance version 2009)
- The Olympian: Lighting of the Torch and Closing for orchestra and chorus (1984)
- Itaipu, a symphonic portrait for chorus and orchestra in four movements (1989)
- Persephone (T.S.E.) for orchestra and chorus (1994, music for a theatre work by Robert Wilson)
- Songs of Milarepa for baritone and chamber orchestra (1997)
- Psalm 126 for orchestra and chorus (1998)
- The Passion of Ramakrishna for chorus and orchestra (2006)

== Concerti and other works for solo instruments and orchestra ==
=== For piano ===
- Piano Concerto No. 1 Tirol, for piano and string orchestra (2000)
- Piano Concerto No. 2 After Lewis and Clark, for piano, Native American flute, and orchestra (2004)
- Piano Concerto No. 3, for piano and string orchestra (2017)

=== For violin ===
- Concerto for Violin and Orchestra No. 1 (1987)
- Echorus for two violins and string orchestra (1995, version of the Etude No. 2 for piano)
- Concerto for Violin and Orchestra No. 2, "The American Four Seasons" (2009)

=== For cello ===
- Concerto for Cello and Orchestra No.1 (2001)
- Concerto for Cello and Orchestra No. 2 Naqoyqatsi (2002/2012)

=== For harpsichord ===
- Concerto for Harpsichord and Orchestra (2002)

=== For multiple soloists ===
- Façades for two saxophones (or flutes) and string orchestra (1981)
- Concerto for Saxophone Quartet and Orchestra (1995)
- Concerto Fantasy for Two Timpanists and Orchestra (2000)
- Double Concerto for Violin, Cello and Orchestra (2010)
- Double Concerto for Two Pianos and Orchestra (2015)

== Works for solo instruments and orchestra, arranged or orchestrated by others ==
- Closing from "Glassworks" for piano and string orchestra (1981, arr. by Michael Riesman)
- Passages for Saxophone Quartet and Orchestra (1989, three movements arranged in 2001 by Dennis Russell Davies)
- Dracula: Suite for string orchestra and piano (1998, arr. by Michael Riesman, 2007)
- Suite from The Hours for piano, strings, harp and celeste (2002, arr. in 2003 by Michael Riesman of Glass's music for the film The Hours)
- Orphée Suite from the opera Orphée for flute, strings and percussion (2017, arr. by James Strauss)
- Flute Concerto for flute and orchestra – transcription from Violin Concerto n. 1 (2017 arr. by James Strauss)

== Vocal works ==
- Music for Voices (1970)
- Hebeve Song for soprano, clarinet and bassoon (1982)
- Songs from Liquid Days for voices and ensemble (texts by Paul Simon, Suzanne Vega, David Byrne and Laurie Anderson, 1985)
- De Cie for four voices (1988)
- Ignorant Sky, Song (1995, for Suzanne Vega)
- The Streets of Berlin, Song (1997, for Mick Jagger)
- Planctus, Song for voice and piano (1997, for Natalie Merchant)
- In the Night Kitchen for voices and chamber ensemble (2005, text by Maurice Sendak)
- Book of Longing for solo voices and chamber ensemble (2007, texts by Leonard Cohen)

== Works for chorus ==
- Haze Gold for chorus (1962, text by Carl Sandburg)
- A Clear Midnight for chorus (early 1960s, text by Carl Sandburg)
- Spring Grass for chorus (early 1960s, text by Carl Sandburg)
- Another Look at Harmony, Part IV for chorus and organ (1977)
- Three Songs for chorus a cappella (1984, texts by Leonard Cohen, Octavio Paz and Raymond Lévesque)

== Works for organ ==
- Dance No. 2 for organ (originally Fourth Series, Part Two, 1978)
- Dance No. 4 for organ (1979)
- Mad Rush for organ (originally Fourth Series Part Four, 1979)
- Voices for organ, didgeridoo and narrator (2001)
- Prelude for organ (2025)

== Music for the theatre ==
Incidental music for stage works:

- Play (Samuel Beckett, 1965)
- The Red Horse Animation (Lee Breuer, 1968)
- The Lost Ones (Beckett, 1975)
- Cascando (Beckett, 1975)
- The Saint and the Football Player (Thibeau and Breuer, 1975)
- Dressed Like an Egg (for Mabou Mines, 1977)
- Cold Harbor (Dale Worsley and Bill Raymond, 1983)
- Company (Beckett, 1984)
- Endgame (Beckett, 1984)
- Worstward Ho (Beckett, 1986)
- The Screens (Jean Genet, 1990, with Foday Musa Suso)
- Cymbeline (Shakespeare, 1991)
- Henry IV, Parts One and Two (Shakespeare, 1992)
- In the Summer House (Jane Bowles, 1993)
- Woyzeck (Georg Büchner, 1993)
- The Elephant Man (2001)
- Beckett Shorts (Beckett, 2007)
- The Bacchae (Euripides, 2008)
- The Crucible (Arthur Miller, 2016)
- King Lear (Shakespeare, 2019)

== Dance scores ==
- Dance (1979, with Lucinda Childs and Sol LeWitt, see works Ensemble and Organ)
- Glass Pieces (1983, for Jerome Robbins, see orchestral works)
- In the Upper Room (1986, for Twyla Tharp, see orchestral works)
- Music for Mysteries and What's So Funny (1991, for David Gordon)
- Heroes Symphony (1996, short version of Symphony No. 4, for Twyla Tharp)

== Film and television scores ==
- Chappaqua (Conrad Rooks, 1966, music by Ravi Shankar, Glass as music supervisor)
- Inquiring Nuns (Gordon Quinn, 1968)
- North Star: Mark di Suvero, Sculptor (François de Menil and Barbara Rose) (1977)
- Sesame Street Cues (1979) [ASCAP Title Code: 498083802]
- Godfrey Reggio's trilogy Koyaanisqatsi (1982), Powaqqatsi (1988) and Naqoyqatsi (2002)
- Mishima: A Life in Four Chapters (Paul Schrader, 1985)
- Hamburger Hill (John Irvin, 1987)
- The Thin Blue Line (Errol Morris, 1988)
- Mindwalk (Bernt Amadeus Capra, 1990)
- A Brief History of Time (Errol Morris, 1991) (biopic based on Stephen Hawking's popular physics book)
- Anima Mundi (Godfrey Reggio, 1992)
- Candyman (Bernard Rose, 1992) (based on Clive Barker's short story, The Forbidden)
- Candyman: Farewell to the Flesh (Bill Condon, 1995)
- Jenipapo (Monique Gardenberg, including a song written for Suzanne Vega, 1995)
- The Secret Agent (Christopher Hampton, 1996)
- Bent (Sean Mathias, 1997)
- Kundun (Martin Scorsese, 1997) (Academy Award nomination)
- The Truman Show (Peter Weir, 1998) (three original tracks, as well as material from Powaqqatsi, Anima Mundi and Mishima)
- Dracula (1998) (re-release of Tod Browning's 1931 film starring Bela Lugosi)
- Shorts (Michal Rovner, Shirin Neshat, Peter Greenaway and Atom Egoyan, 2001)
- The Baroness and the Pig (Michael Mackenzie, 2002)
- The Hours (Stephen Daldry, 2002) (Academy Award nomination, BAFTA win)
- The Fog of War (Errol Morris, 2003) (an interview of Robert McNamara, former U.S. Secretary of Defense)
- Going Upriver: The Long War of John Kerry (George Butler, 2004)
- Secret Window (David Koepp, 2004)
- Taking Lives (D.J. Caruso, 2004)
- Undertow (David Gordon Green, 2004)
- Neverwas (Joshua Michael Stern, 2005)
- Night Stalker (2005, theme music)
- The Reaping (Stephen Hopkins, 2006) (rejected)
- Chaotic Harmony (Sat Chuen Hon, 2006)
- Roving Mars (George Butler, 2006)
- The Illusionist (Neil Burger, 2006)
- A Crude Awakening: The Oil Crash (Basil Gelpke and Ray McCormack, 2006)
- Notes on a Scandal (Richard Eyre, 2006) (Academy Award nomination)
- No Reservations (Scott Hicks, 2007)
- Cassandra's Dream (Woody Allen, 2007)
- Les Animaux amoureux (Laurent Charbonnier, 2007)
- Transcendent Man (Barry Ptolemy, 2009)
- Rebirth (Jim Whitaker, 2010)
- Mr. Nice (Bernard Rose, 2010)
- Astral City: A Spiritual Journey (Wagner de Assis, 2010)
- Icarus at the End of Time (2010)
- Elena (Andrey Zvyagintsev, 2011)
- They Were There (Errol Morris, 2011)
- Visitors (Godfrey Reggio, 2013)
- Fantastic Four (Josh Trank, 2015)
- Jane (Brett Morgen, 2017)
- Samurai Marathon (Bernard Rose, 2019)
- Tales from the Loop (Amazon Original, 2020)
- Once Within a Time (Godfrey Reggio, 2023)

== Arrangements ==
- Icct Hedral for orchestra (1995, from the electronic track by Aphex Twin)
- Sound of Silence for piano (2005, from the song by Paul Simon)

== Other works ==
- One Plus One for amplified tabletop (1967)
- Long Beach Island, Word Location (1969, sculpture, a collaboration with Richard Serra)
- The Late Great Johnny Ace, coda to the song from Paul Simon's Hearts and Bones (1983)
- Pink Noise, acoustic installation (1987, with Richard Serra)
- Brown Piano, Martingala, Double Rhythm, Boogie Mood, Sax, Variation: alarm bleeps for Swatch wristwatches (1994, some with Jean-Michel Jarre)
- Aguas da Amazonia (arranged and performed by Uakti from 12 Pieces for Ballet, 1993/1999)
- Spoleto Fanfare (2006), for carillon
