= Cello Concerto No. 1 (Glass) =

2001 cello concerto by Philip Glass

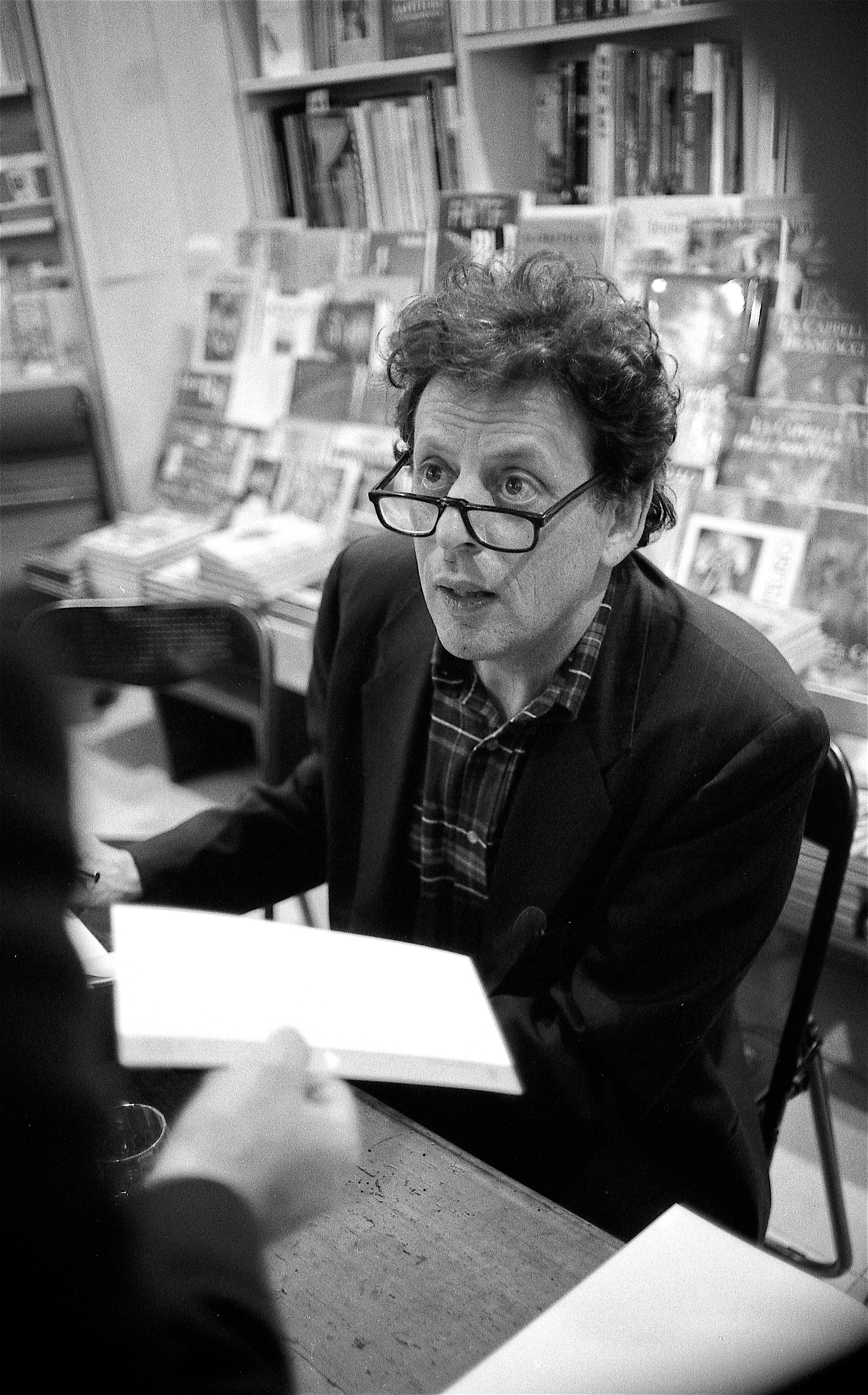
Philip Glass

The Cello Concerto No. 1 (also the Concerto for Cello and Orchestra) was written by Philip Glass in 2001. It was one of the first concerti of the twenty-first century. The piece was commissioned by William and Rebecca Krueger, friends of both the cellist Julian Lloyd Webber and the conductor Yu Long in celebration of Lloyd Webber's 50th birthday and the first anniversary of Maestro Yu's China Philharmonic Orchestra. The work was premiered by Lloyd Webber with Long Yu conducting the China Philharmonic during the 2001 Beijing Music Festival, and attracted significant attention as the first time the work of a major western composer had its world premiere in China. A typical performance takes about 30 minutes. The work is paired with the Concerto Fantasy for Two Timpanists and Orchestra as part of Glass' Concerto Project, a series of collected concerti by the composer. The cello concerto is among the most famous of Glass' works for a solo instrument.

== Classification ==
The work has noticeable "classical" (as Glass would describe his current musical style) elements in addition to minimalist ones; while it still projects many of the minimalist aspects which characterize Glass' music, it has audible differences, ushering a new look to composition in Glass' more recent musical approach.

== Structure ==
The concerto is in the standard three movement form (this is notable because, as with the earlier Violin Concerto, Glass did not intend for the work to conform to conventional concerto structure as much as the piece simply developed that way). The three movements comply with the traditional fast-slow-fast tempo configuration.

=== First movement ===
The beginning movement opens with the cello directly introducing the first theme, a dark motif which would vary throughout the piece. The cello then exchanges bursts with the brass and returns to the original theme. We then hear a new, more placid melody, introduced by both the cello and orchestra. The movement progresses as the orchestra appears in full, developing into a fluid yet compact climax, interspersed with periodic cello arpeggios. After several minutes of intense orchestral involvement, the piece suddenly quietens and the second theme is eerily restated on the cello in very high register. The introductory material is then recapitulated by the woodwinds and triangle, with the cello providing a repeating undertone. The first movement closes softly and mysteriously.

=== Second movement ===
The second movement is the concerto's calmest, punctuated by a soft, lyrical flute theme. The movement concludes in a similar manner to the first, with a dark, quiet close.

=== Third movement ===
Abruptly, the third movement jolts into play with a short, unexpected burst of the brass, followed immediately by the cello stating the familiar opening theme from the first movement. Afterwards, the cello rises in volume until it unexpectedly fades and the orchestra takes over, progressing with repeating trumpets and rapid bass (not unlike the brass repetition of Mars, the Bringer of War in Holst's The Planets); this builds into a climactic moment in the movement, an ecstatic, dance-like section with layered harmonies, punctuated by distant clangs of a bell. Afterward, the cello reappears and works with the orchestra until it returns to another crescendo, restating the first climax. Then, with the tambourine continuing the dance-like feel, the orchestra rises and falls, with the cello spiralling downward; the orchestra plays rapid, whirling notes until it reaches resolution. The ghostlike feel of the earlier movements forgotten, the work concludes with distinctive finality, a four-note bang similar to that of Rachmaninov's in his Piano Concerto No. 2 and No. 3.

== Premiere ==
Glass wrote the concerto to be performed first in Beijing. The piece was premiered at the Beijing Music Festival with the China Philharmonic Orchestra, with Julian Lloyd Webber as soloist and Yu Long conducting, on October 21, 2001. The orchestra had been founded the year before and this concerto was the first work that it played by a major living composer. Glass could not attend the performance; in an interview, he revealed that he subsequently did not attend a playing of the concerto until six years after it premiered. It is relatively popular, but has had little time to attain the level of attention and analysis as some of Glass' earlier concerti or other large-scale symphonic works. However, listeners continue to increase.

=== The Concerto Project ===
The cello concerto was one of a series of eight concerti designated as part of The Concerto Project, started in 2000. The work was preceded by the Concerto Fantasy for Two Timpanists and Orchestra (2000), the latter of which is paired with the cello concerto in the recording Project Vol. 1. Glass wrote the decisively neo-baroque Concerto for Harpsichord and Orchestra in 2002, and the Piano Concerto No. 2: After Lewis and Clark in 2004. Other parts of the series include the Concerto Grosso, the Concerto for Saxophone Quartet and Orchestra and the Tirol Concerto for Piano and Orchestra, often referred to as Piano Concerto No. 1. Note that the Violin Concerto No. 2 is not listed as part of the Project; it was written eight years after the cello concerto.

There are currently four volumes of the Project, with eight concerti indicated as members of the series.

== Recordings ==
- 2001: Julian Lloyd Webber (cello) and Gerard Schwarz (with Royal Liverpool Philharmonic Orchestra), recorded 2004, released 2004 on The Concerto Project Vol. I (Orange Mountain Music) as "Concerto for Cello and Orchestra" (31:02).
- 2011: Wendy Sutter (cello) and Dante Anzolini (with Orchestra of the Americas), recorded 2011, released 2011 as "Concerto for Cello and Orchestra No. 1" (Orange Mountain Music) (31:02).

== See also ==
- Violin Concerto
- Minimalism
- Julian Lloyd Webber
- Classicism
- List of compositions by Philip Glass
- China Philharmonic Orchestra
