= The Concerto Project =

Collection of compositions by Philip Glass

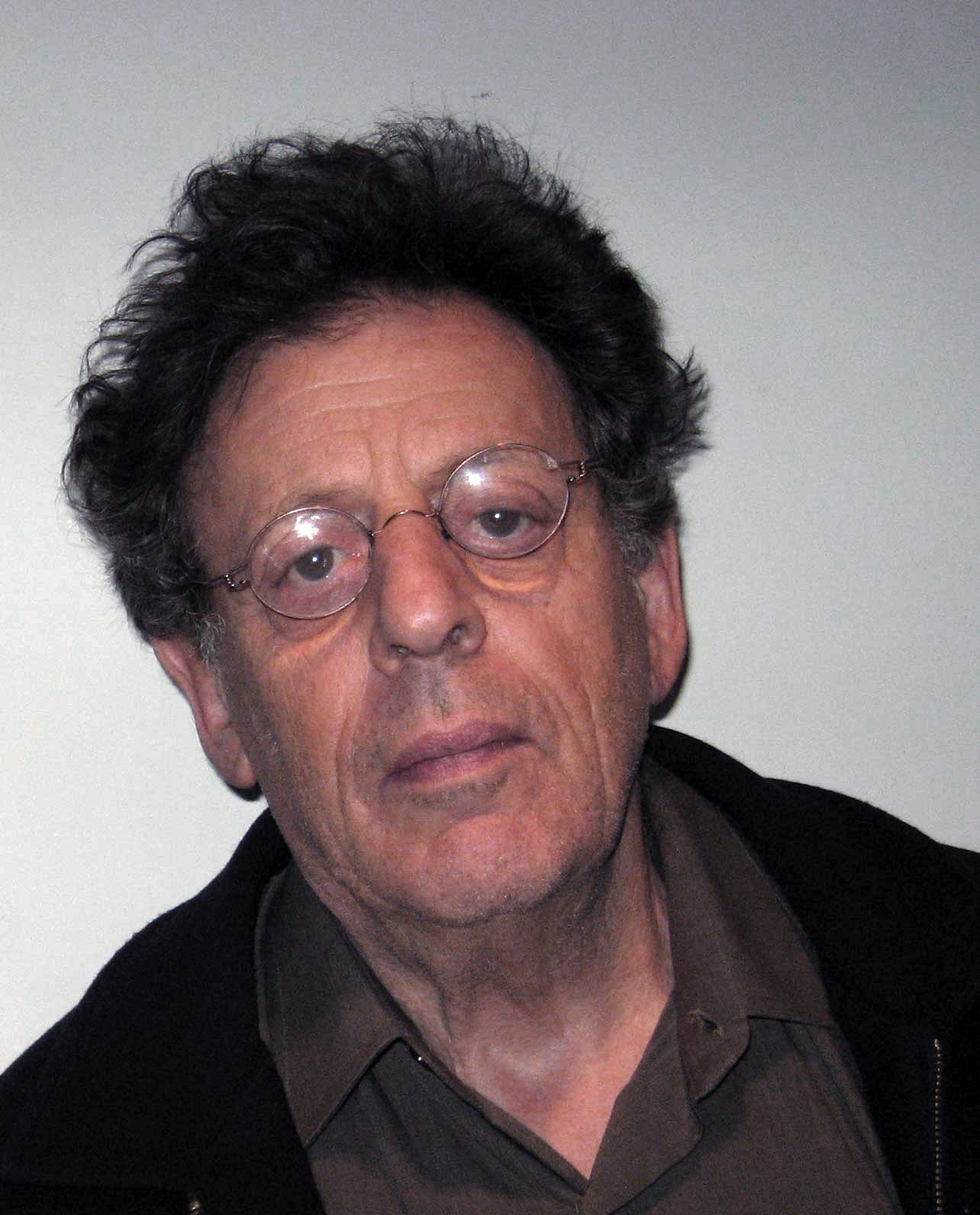
Philip Glass

The Concerto Project is a collection of concerti written by Philip Glass. The series was begun in 2000 and contains eight works, the most famous of which is probably the Concerto for Cello and Orchestra. Some of the concerti in the volumes were written before the commencement of the project and were categorized into the series.

== Volumes ==
There are four volumes of the Project:

- The Concerto Project Vol. I, containing the Cello Concerto and the Concerto Fantasy for Two Timpanists and Orchestra.
- The Concerto Project Vol. II, containing the Piano Concerto No. 2: After Lewis and Clark, and the Concerto for Harpsichord and Orchestra.
- The Concerto Project Vol. III, containing the Concerto Grosso and the Concerto for Saxophone Quartet and Orchestra.
- The Concerto Project Vol. IV, containing the Double Concerto for Violin, Cello and Orchestra and the Tirol Concerto for Piano and Orchestra (also known simply as Piano Concerto No. 1).

These concerti were all produced by Orange Mountain Music.

== Background ==
=== Commission ===
Philip Glass wrote all of the concerti on commission from various ensembles or people; the Concerto Fantasy, for example, was requested by Jonathan Haas, a respected timpanist. Glass stated in 2000: "Jonathan Haas approached me almost ten years ago with an invitation to write a Timpani Concerto for him. It seemed we were in agreement to begin our project when a series of operas and symphonic commissions led to a series of postponements. Now, years later, the work is finally completed, a three movement concerto with cadenza. It has also grown into a "double" concerto requiring two timpanists playing a total of nine timpani between them."

Similarly, the Cello Concerto was commissioned by friends of Glass, William and Rebecca Kreuger, for the fiftieth birthday of renowned cellist Julian Lloyd Webber, who later premiered the piece in Beijing.

=== Composition and influence ===
Some of the concerti were written about the same time as Glass' later symphonies, and distinct similarities can be heard, especially in the Toltec Symphony.

Along with Glass' recent symphonic work, the pieces mark a certain progression of Glass' musical approach; audibly, it can be seen that the composer has undergone major changes since his earlier, pro-minimalist period. Although Glass' music can still, in some sense, be categorized as "minimalist," the composer appears to have more classical tendencies, and has himself described his music as "classicist." These concerti are therefore a high-point of Glass' classical direction: they demonstrate a distinct combination of Postmodernist methods and older, more conventional repertoire (incidentally, Glass' favorite composer is Schubert, whose Classical-Romantic bridging can be heard as a considerable influence on the contemporary composer's stylistic moves).

Also discernible is a slight influence from the post-Mahlerian revolutionaries, mostly that of Stravinsky—on whom Glass has written extensively—in that the tempi are occasionally irregular: an uncommon choice for Glass, who usually stays strict to rhythmic pulse. This stray from uncompromising adherence to Glass' branch of minimalism can possibly be interpreted as an indication of a new level of musical progression, as well a statement supporting the continuation of an ongoing musical evolution. The concerti are considered hallmarks of twenty-first century classical composition, and have been performed many times.

For more information about the selected works, visit the Philip Glass page.

== Recordings ==
These are recordings of the eight concerti within each of the volumes:

=== Vol. I ===
- 2001: Julian Lloyd Webber (cello) and Gerard Schwarz (with Royal Liverpool Philharmonic Orchestra), recorded 2004, released 2004 on The Concerto Project Vol. I (Orange Mountain Music) as "Concerto for Cello and Orchestra" (20:47).
- 2000: Evelyn Glennie, Jonathan Haas (timpani) and Gerard Schwarz (with Royal Liverpool Philharmonic Orchestra), recorded 2004, released 2004 on The Concerto Project Vol. I (Orange Mountain Music) as "Concerto Fantasy for Two Timpanists and Orchestra" (24:27).

=== Vol. II ===
- 2004: Paul Barnes (piano) and Ralf Gothóni (with Northwest Chamber Orchestra), recorded 2006, released 2006 on The Concerto Project Vol. II (Orange Mountain Music) as "Piano Concerto No. 2: After Lewis and Clark" (35:26).
- 2002: Jillon Stoppels Dupree (harpsichord) and Ralf Gothóni (with Northwest Chamber Orchestra), recorded 2006, released 2006 on The Concerto Project Vol. II (Orange Mountain Music) as "Concerto for Harpsichord and Orchestra" (19:32).

=== Vol. III ===
- 1992: Various soloists and Dennis Russell Davies (with Beethoven Orchester Bonn), recorded 2008, released 2008 on The Concerto Project Vol. III (Orange Mountain Music) as "Concerto Grosso" (22:43).
- 1995: Raschèr Saxophone Quartet (saxophones) and Roy Goodman (with Swedish Radio Orchestra Stockholm), recorded 2008, released 2008 on The Concerto Project Vol. III (Orange Mountain Music) as "Concerto for Saxophone Quartet and Orchestra" (26:53).

=== Vol. IV ===
- 2010: Cecilia Bernardini (violin), Maarte-Maria den Herder (cello) and Jurjen Hempel (with the Hague Philharmonic, Residentie Orkest), recorded 2010, released 2011 on The Concerto Project Vol. IV (Orange Mountain Music) as "Double Concerto for Violin, Cello and Orchestra" (31:32).
- 2000: Dennis Russell Davies at piano and conducting (with the Stuttgart Chamber Orchestra), recorded 2002, released 2011 on The Concerto Project Vol. IV (Orange Mountain Music) as "Tirol Concerto for Piano and Orchestra" (28:47).

== See also ==
- Minimalism
- Julian Lloyd Webber
- Concerto for Cello and Orchestra
- Evelyn Glennie
- List of compositions by Philip Glass
