= Piano Concerto No. 2 (Glass) =

2004 piano work by Philip Glass

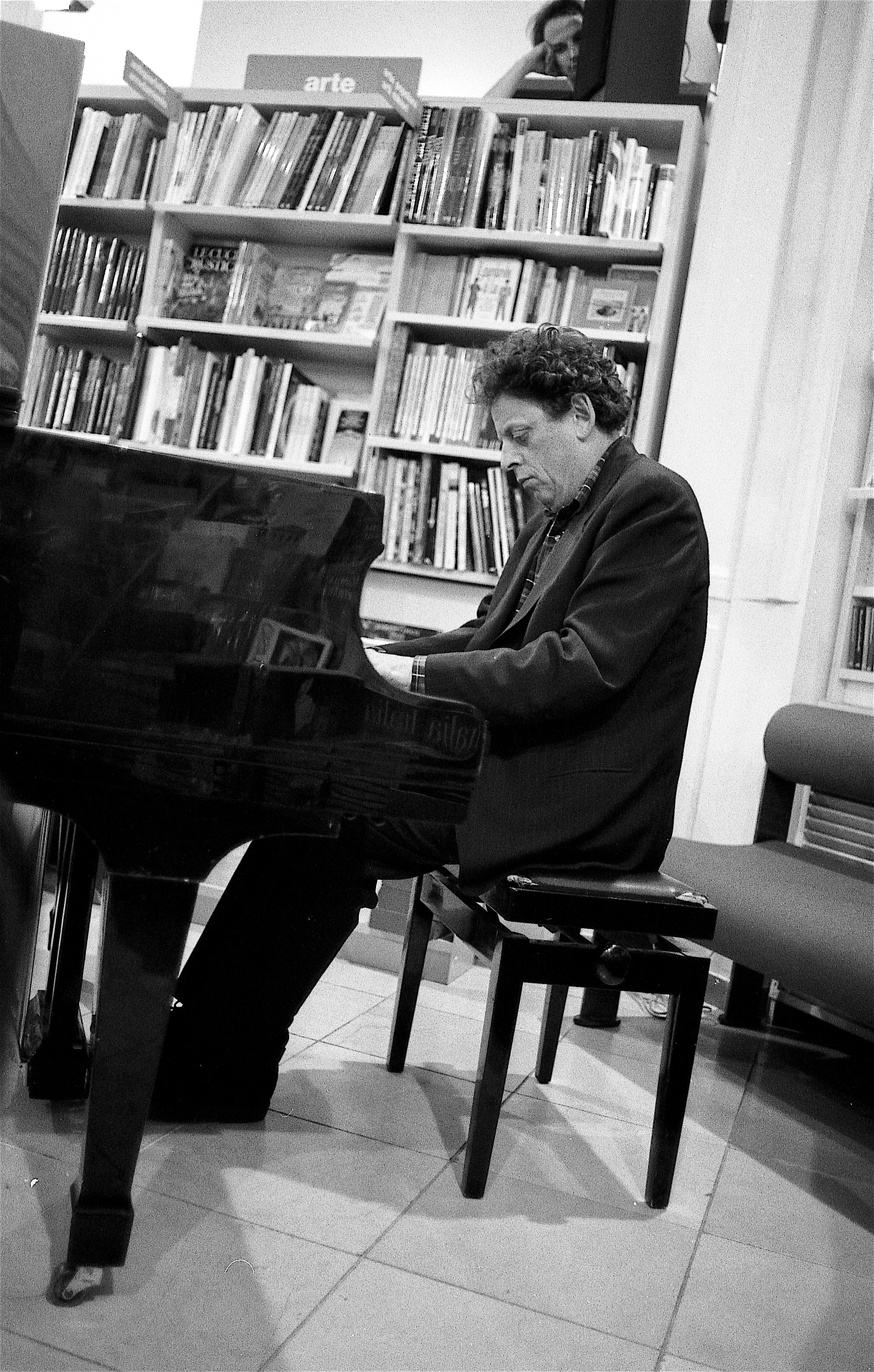
Philip Glass

The Piano Concerto No. 2 was written by American composer Philip Glass in 2004. It is also called the Piano Concerto No. 2: After Lewis and Clark, due to its musical representation of the American pioneers. It was composed for the Nebraska Lewis and Clark Bicentennial Commission, the Lied Center for Performing Arts, and the University of Nebraska-Lincoln Hixson–Lied College of Fine and Performing Arts. It is included as one of the concerti in Glass' Concerto Project, a four-volume collection of commissioned works. The work itself deals with the journey of Meriwether Lewis and William Clark, interpreting the stages of their expedition progressively in each movement.

== Instrumentation ==
The work is scored for the following Classical-size orchestra:

- One Native American flute, one clarinet, one oboe, one bassoon
- One trumpet, two horns in F
- Bass drum, snare drum, cymbals, tambourine
- Strings and solo piano

Note that this orchestration is relatively small-scale in comparison to much of Glass' other symphonic work.

== Structure ==
The work is in the standard three-movement concerto format, with the traditional fast-slow-fast tempo changes. As he discussed in regard to his earlier Violin Concerto, Glass did not use the conventional format as a cession to tradition, but rather as a tool for depiction of the specific concerto theme.

=== I. The Vision ===
The opening movement begins with a broad statement by the piano and orchestra, working in unison to form a collaboration of orchestral minor chords and a whirling series of piano triplets shifting between minor and major modes. The agitated introduction settles onto a simple but expressive main theme punctuated by the tambourine. After a short while the piece quietens into a quick piano solo, which soon develops into a mellow exchange between the piano and woodwinds. The movement builds in intensity with characteristic Glass octave leaps into a rhythmic and repetitive climax sponsoring a calling trumpet supported by rapidly shifting piano undertones. Gradually the climax declines until the snare and piano share two major-key progressions, signalling a short but fluid exit of instruments. The last to leave are the strings; the piano then concludes the movement alone in soft minor resolutions (in some ways similar to those finishing the cadenza of Tchaikovsky's First Piano Concerto.)

The subject matter of the first movement concentrates on the possibilities of the Lewis and Clark Expedition; Glass intends to indicate an amount of raw energy required for a "remarkable expedition" like that of the two men. Glass also wishes to convey a sense of structure and order, symbolizing the resolve of travelers; he does so by strictly controlling the energy expressed in the music, but allowing it to spark the thoughts of the listener beyond the confinement of rhythm.

=== II. Sacagawea ===
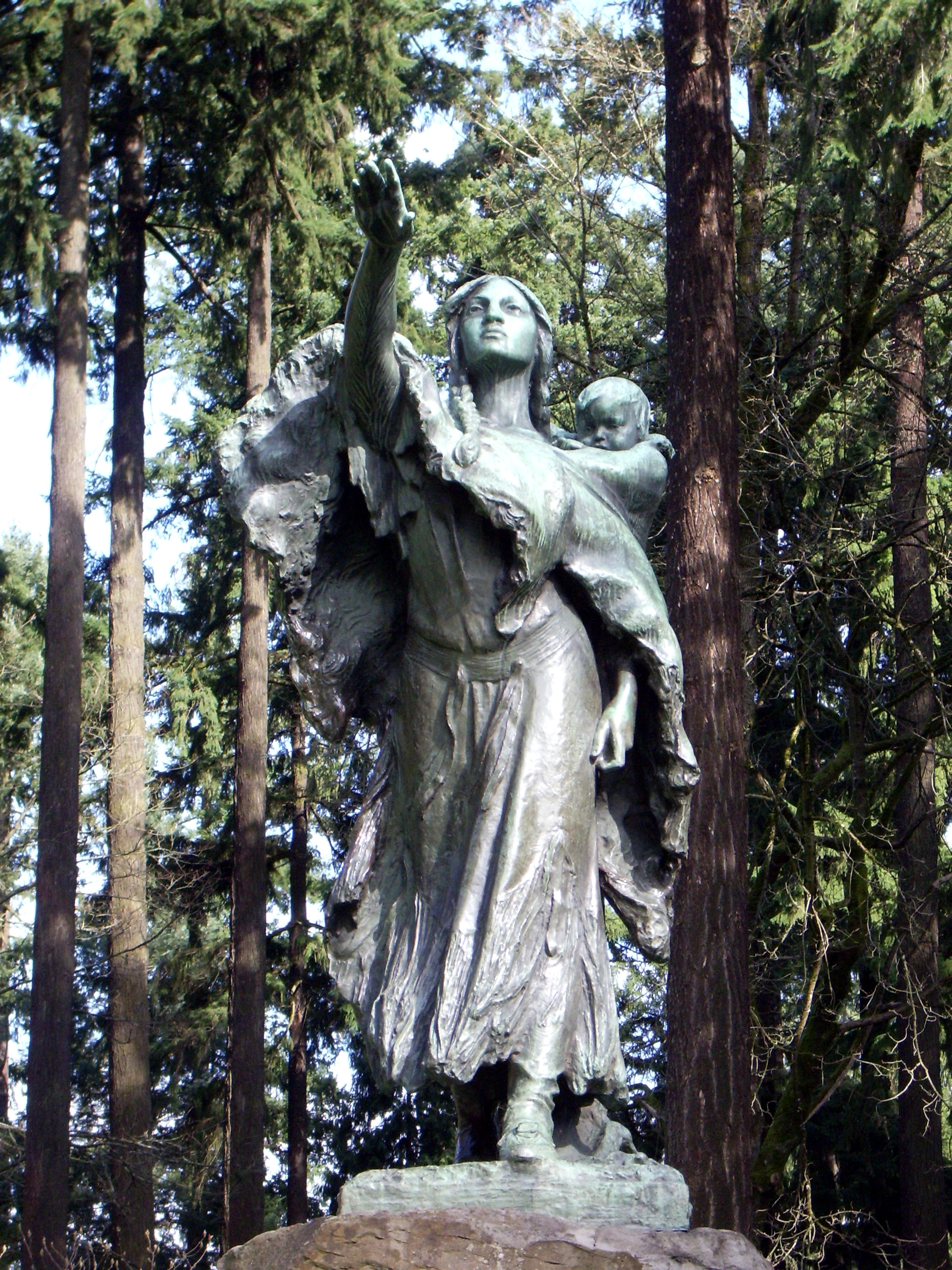
Sacagawea, the subject of the second movement. Sculpture in Washington Park (Portland, Oregon), designed by Alice Cooper.

The second movement is characterized by a soft flute theme representing Sacagawea, the Native American girl who aided the travelers during the harsh winter during their trek through the United States midwest. The movement opens with piano repetitions; the flute, joining quickly in the movement, proclaims an eerie theme. This suddenly shifts into a mild, playful exchange in which the piano and flute form a quick duet; this in turn develops into a climax, where shimmering strings support the flute, which continuously plays a growingly frantic two-note combination without resolution. Abruptly ending, the climax turns into a recapitulation of the original "Sacagawea" theme. The second part concludes with the lonely flute performing long, simple notes, and the piano playing almost indiscernible C major chords.

The second part is only scored for flute, snare, strings, and naturally piano. Not only does Glass attempt to make an audible representation of Sacagawea, but he also makes a clear effort to emphasize the relationship between the figures. The times of playfulness are distinct from those of sombre exchange; these are meant to symbolize the productivity of the relationship as well as potential disagreements (both logistical and cultural) that the party may have had, respectively. The second movement is also notable in that it shows a distinct change in Glass' style, a statement supported by the fact that the piano mentions the characteristic triplet construction used by Glass in most of his work only once; this is stated as a connector into the final touches of the movement.

=== III. The Land ===
The final movement begins quietly. All of the instruments excluded from the preceding movement are reintroduced. After a series of sullen string lengths, as well as quick woodwind undertone, the piano enters the movement uncommonly late-more than two minutes into play. After some time, the work begins to escalate until it reaches a climactic moment in the concerto, a point of unforeseen energy and enthusiasm. This is recapitulated multiple times before the movement reverts to its original minor mode introductory material. The concerto finishes with piano solo, sadly playing low F minor chords.

The final part of the work is, perhaps, its most important. Glass comments: "I wanted this final movement to reflect also the expanse of time - what the land was before the expedition and what it became after." Glass emphasizes progression in this movement; this may be interpreted, in light of Glass' words, to be a movement of the country in and of itself, its successes and failures, and most importantly its Western expansion which was begun by the Lewis and Clark expedition.

== Premiere ==
The concerto premiered in 2004 at the Lied Center for Performing Arts in Lincoln, Nebraska. The pianist was Paul Barnes. Playing the prominent flute part of the second movement was R. Carlos Nakai. The Omaha Symphony Orchestra provided for the rest of the scoring commands; the orchestra was conducted by Victor Yampolsky. The premiere was a success, although, due to its youth as a concerto, the work has not received the full scope of musical attention given to that of Glass' earlier work.

Part of The Concerto Project

The Concerto Project is a series of concerti written and collected by Glass in four volumes. This concerto was chosen to be included in Volume II of the collection. It is paired with the Concerto for Harpsichord and Orchestra on that disc. The recording of the work on the program is as follows:

- 2004: Paul Barnes (piano) and Ralf Gothóni (with Northwest Chamber Orchestra), recorded 2006, released 2006 on The Concerto Project Vol. II (Orange Mountain Music) as "Piano Concerto No. 2: After Lewis and Clark" (35:26).

== Analysis ==
=== Relation to minimalism ===
Although Philip Glass dislikes the term "minimalist," most of his work is categorized that way by the public; the Piano Concerto No. 2 is an example of a break from minimalism, in accordance with the composer's opinion of his own music (which he calls "classicist").

Although the repetitiveness which is associated with Glass' branch of minimalism (particularly in that of the triplet) is present in the concerto, there are, as in the progressively separatist Concerto for Cello and Orchestra written three years before, many differences. For example, the abovementioned flute involvement in the second movement displays almost no pertinence to minimalism: the part is varied and unpredictable, a clear distinction between the assumed minimalist norm and the actual piece. Similarly, the opening movement makes heavy use of abruptness and unclear musical expression; although this is arguably a decisively modern musical trait, it is incongruous with the current mode of minimalism. The piece is also considered to be an experimentation with World music; this is manifested in the frequent use of long, distant chords.

=== Representation of the expedition ===
The concerto is in such a format so as to convey a sense of movement, both in the music and its depiction, the expedition. The soloist premiering the piece, Paul Barnes, comments: "'The Land' is a gloriously expansive theme and variation reflecting the great vastness of the land explored by Lewis and Clark." Glass wishes to describe the nation's nineteenth century stance of "manifest destiny", a policy largely initiated, if only indirectly, by the team's journey. Glass achieves this goal by infusing into the third movement a fully energetic high-point, with possible variation on American folk songs, a tradition from which the composer sometimes takes influence. The common use of long, sweeping major and minor chords can be interpreted as a tactic used to create the "distant" feel of the expedition, as well as the comparative strangeness of the world explored by the travelers. This stratagem is also employed as a conveyance of the apprehension the Americans probably felt, in addition to their presupposed feelings regarding the cultural differences of Western and Native American societies.

== See also ==
- List of compositions by Philip Glass
- Lewis and Clark Expedition
- Violin Concerto
- Concerto for Cello and Orchestra
- The Concerto Project
- Minimalism
- Paul Barnes
- Sacagawea
