= Orphée (Glass) =

1991 chamber opera by Philip Glass

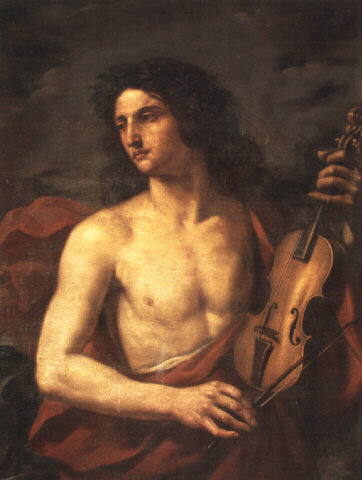
Orpheus by Cesare Gennari

Orphée is a chamber opera in two acts and 18 scenes, for ensemble and soloists, composed in 1991 by Philip Glass, to a libretto (in French) by the composer, based on the scenario of the eponymous film (1950) by Jean Cocteau. Commissioned by the American Repertory Theater in Cambridge, Massachusetts, and the Brooklyn Academy of Music in New York, this is the first part of a trilogy in honour of the French poet. The world premiere of the work took place on 14 May 1993 under the direction of Martin Goldray and the European premiere in London on 27 May 2005 in the Royal Opera House's Linbury Studio Theatre.

Orphée was later performed at the Linz State Theatre, on 21 January 2007, at the Alice Busch Opera Theater of Cooperstown as part of the Glimmerglass Festival for ten days from 21 July 2007 at the Portland Opera (Keller Auditorium) for five days from 6 November 2009 Anne Manson conducting, at the Herbst Theatre of San Francisco, 26 February 2011 Nicole Paiement conducting, at the George Mason University (Center for the Arts) of Fairfax for two days from 10 February 2012.

In 2000, Paul Barnes produced a piano transcription entitled The Orphée Suite for Piano and first performed on 19 April 2001 at the Greenwich House Music School of New York.

A new production by the English National Opera was premiered at the London Coliseum on 15 November 2019.

== Roles ==
Roles, voice types, premiere casts
Role	Voice type	Premiere cast, 14 May 1993 Music direction: Martin Goldray
The Princess	soprano	Wendy Hill
Eurydice	soprano	Elizabeth Futral
Heurtebise	tenor	Richard Fracker
Cégeste	tenor	Paul Kirby
Orphée	baritone	Eugène Perry
The Judge	bass	John Kuether
The Poet	bass	James Ramlet
The Commissioner	bass	John Kuether
Aglaonice	mezzo-soprano	Janice Felty
The Reporter	tenor	Brian Mirabile
Glazier	tenor	Brian Mirabile
Ensemble		Linda Joy Adams; Charles Butler; Robert K. Dunn; Michael Glumicich; Rachael Lillis; Ken MacDonald; Stephen Spewock; Hester A. Tinti

== Structure ==
- Act 1
  - Scene 1, le Café
  - Scene 2, la Route
  - Scene 3, le Chalet
  - Scene 4, Chez Orphée
  - Scene 5, la Chambre d'Orphée
  - Scene 6, le Studio d'Orphée
  - Scene 7, le Bureau du Commissaire
  - Scene 8, la Poursuite
  - Scene 9, Chez Orphée
- Act 2
  - Scene 1, le Voyage aux Enfers
  - Scene 2, le Procès
  - Scene 3, Orphée et la Princesse
  - Scene 4, le Verdict
  - Scene 5, Interlude musical - le retour chez Orphée
  - Scene 6, Chez Orphée
  - Scene 7, le Studio d'Orphée
  - Scene 8, le Retour d'Orphée
  - Scene 9, la Chambre d'Orphée

== Discography ==
- The Orphée Suite for Piano, music by Philip Glass, transcription by Paul Barnes (piano), recorded in April 2001. Orange Mountain Music (2003).
- The Portland Opera Orchestra conducted by Anne Manson, first full version recorded in November 2009. Orange Mountain Music (2010).
- The Orphée Suite for Flute, strings, and percussion , music by Philip Glass, transcription by James Strauss (flute) and Camerata Simon Bolivar, recorded in April 2017. Orange Mountain Music (2019).

== Bibliography ==
- Orphée: The Making of an Opera, Philip Glass, n.n editions (1993) ISBN 3-930-05801-4
- Orphée Suite for Piano (score), Philip Glass, Dunvagen Music Publishers (2006) ISBN 1-846-09578-6
- Orphée (the play), Le Livre de Poche, La Pochothèque (1995) ISBN 9782253132219
- Orphée (scenario of the film), J'ai lu, Librio n°75 (2001) ISBN 2-290-31466-8

=== See also ===
The other operas of the trilogy are:

- Les Enfants terribles (1993)
- La Belle et la Bête (1994)
