= Concerto Fantasy for Two Timpanists and Orchestra =

2000 timpani concerto by Philip Glass

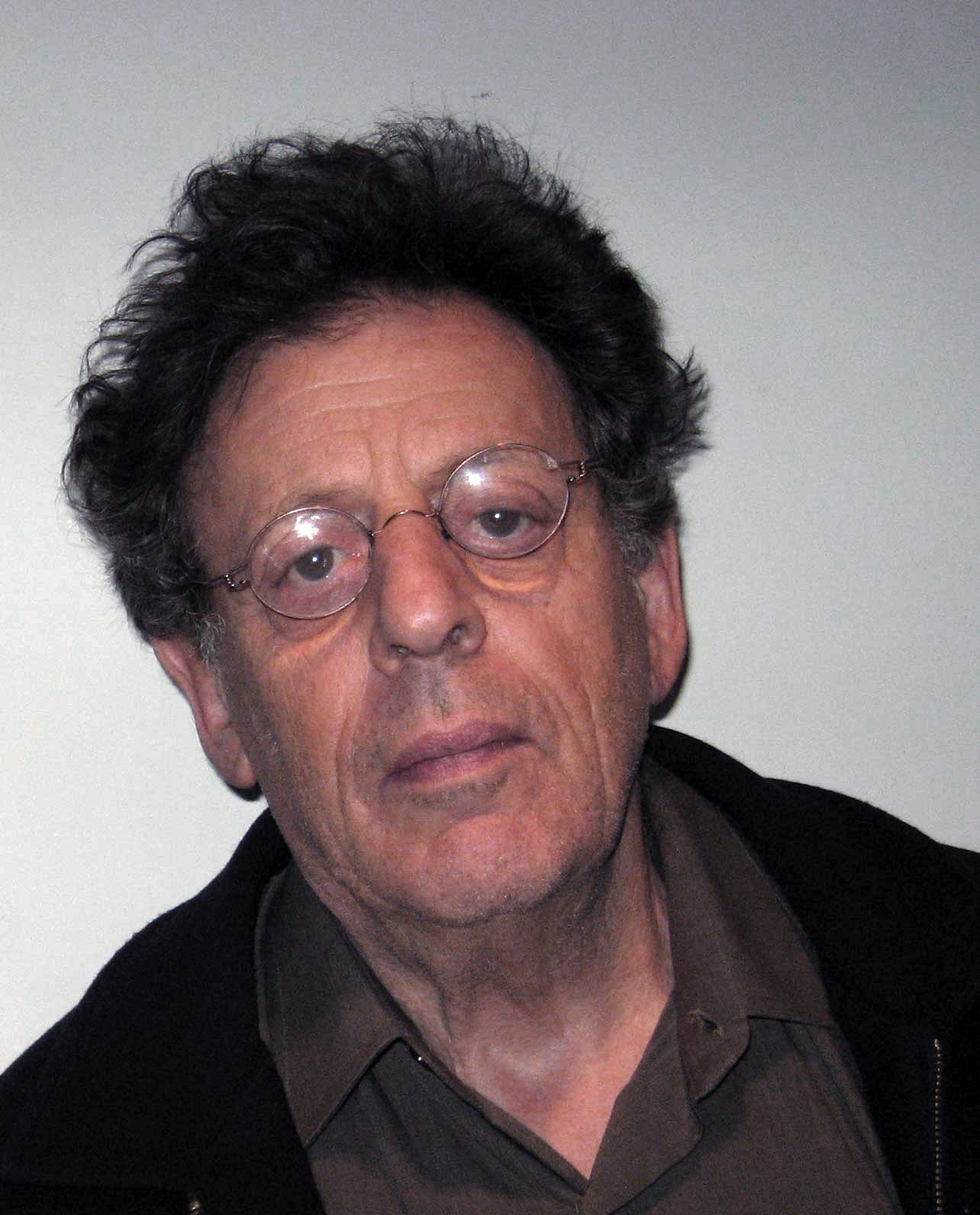
Philip Glass in 2007

The Concerto Fantasy for Two Timpanists and Orchestra is a double timpani concerto written by Philip Glass in 2000. It is paired with the Cello Concerto on Volume I of Glass' Concerto Project, a set of eight concerti by the composer. A typical performance of the work lasts 25–28 minutes.

It was written for Jonathan Haas and later recorded by Evelyn Glennie, and was premiered by Haas and Svet Stoyanov with the American Symphony Orchestra in Avery Fisher Hall, Lincoln Center, conducted by Leon Botstein. The work was commissioned jointly by the American Symphony Orchestra, the Peabody Symphony, the Milwaukee Symphony Orchestra, the St. Louis Symphony Orchestra and the Phoenix Symphony. In 2004, a transcription for wind ensemble was written by Mark Lortz, which debuted at Peabody Institute in 2005.

== Orchestration ==
The concerto is scored for a large orchestra with particular emphasis on percussion:

- Woodwinds: piccolo, 2 flutes, 2 oboes, E♭ clarinet, 2 B♭ clarinets, bass clarinet in B♭, 2 bassoons
- Brass: 4 horns in F, 3 trumpets in B♭, 2 trombones, bass trombone, tuba
- Percussion (4 players): snare drum, glockenspiel, xylophone, tenor drum, bass drum, piano, triangle, tambourine, tom-tom, tam-tam, chime, wood block, cymbals, suspended cymbals, vibraphone, marimba
- Strings: harp, piano, violins I and II, violas, cellos, double basses
- Two solo timpanis

== Structure ==
Glass wrote this work in standard three-movement concerto format.

=== Movement I ===
The first movement begins with an immediate presentation of the opening thematic material, a ten-note statement of the strings in conjunction with powerful timpani strikes. The strings and brass proceed to develop this statement while the soloists provide relatively constant rhythmic undertone. After perhaps two minutes, woodwinds introduce a new, less fierce theme which leads into a slightly varied recapitulation of the first statement. Glass then inserts a characteristic series of Chord progressions often present in his mature style. These rise in intensity, flying into a complex, ecstatic tutti. Playing throughout the majority of the movement, the timpani guide the orchestra into a quick descent, and, having quieted the ensemble, provide gentle pulse. Brass play some short chords, and then settle onto a lingering resolution. The movement, approximately six minutes in length, draws to a tranquil close.

=== Movement II ===
The slow movement opens with a distant trumpet call, with both timpani playing quietly. This presents an ominous feel; the introduction closely resembles an approaching, marching army. Soon the strings play an eerie, shimmering accompaniment to this scene. A quiet woodwind section gives a low pulse typical of Glass, in accordance with a similar throb of the tambourines. Although there are periodic rises, there is no apparent climax and the movement concludes quietly. Its duration is nine minutes.

=== Movement III ===
A cadenza, for both timpani, opens the final movement. Occasionally it is set aside as a separate section of the concerto, but on most recordings, it is featured as part of the third movement. During the cadenza, both timpani engage in exchanges, whose character range from almost inaudible to deafeningly loud. At one point Glass instructs the timpanists to abandon their mallets and play with their bare hands, creating higher pitch.

The orchestra reenters with a sudden burst of cymbals, after which the cadenza segues directly into the third movement proper, with a rapid rhythm set by wood block and other auxiliary percussion. The orchestra gradually builds up intensity; the movement grows into a passionate, major-key high-point consisting of quick triplets from a number of instruments, with the timpani providing unceasing, driving pulse. Suddenly the excitement dies; nevertheless, the woodblocks continue the rhythm set earlier. As if the first period of animation was a mere precursor, the movement rebuilds itself into an even louder and more enthusiastic climax, the timpani performing complex maneuvers in coordination with one another. Set into full-force vigor, the movement concludes triumphantly on a version of Glass' signature four-note concerto motif, which is also used to conclude the Cello Concerto No. 1, the Harpsichord Concerto (Glass), and the Tirol Piano Concerto. This motif is probably inspired by Rachmaninoff's signature concerto ending, which is a similar burst of four notes.

Throughout the entirety of the last movement (and for much of the concerto), the timpani have intense, constant involvement, which is taxing for the performers. Therefore, this piece has developed a reputation of requiring energetic soloists.

== Premiere ==
The concerto was premiered on November 19, 2000, in New York's Lincoln Center. The two soloists were Jonathan Haas and Svetoslav Stoyanov, playing with the American Symphony Orchestra, conducted by Leon Botstein. The work has become popular and was later performed by Haas and John Chimes with the BBC Symphony Orchestra, conducted by Marin Alsop. In addition, the work has been conducted under Gerard Schwarz, performed by Evelyn Glennie, Haas and the Royal Liverpool Philharmonic Orchestra. This work was also included in The Concerto Project, located on volume I.

== Carnegie Hall Performance ==
The concerto was performed at Carnegie Hall’s Stern Auditorium/Perelman Stage on February 27, 2018, by the Louisiana Philharmonic Orchestra in its debut. The appearance was during Glass' 2017-2018 residency and featured only two orchestras, the LPO and Orange County, California's Pacific Symphony. Conducted by then music director, Carlos Miguel Prieto, the performance also featured La noche de los Mayas by Silvestre Revueltas, along with Philip Glass's Days and Nights in Rocinha. The soloists on the program were Jim Atwood and Paul Yanncich who played nine timpani between them.
