= Harpsichord Concerto (Glass) =

2002 harpsichord work by Philip Glass

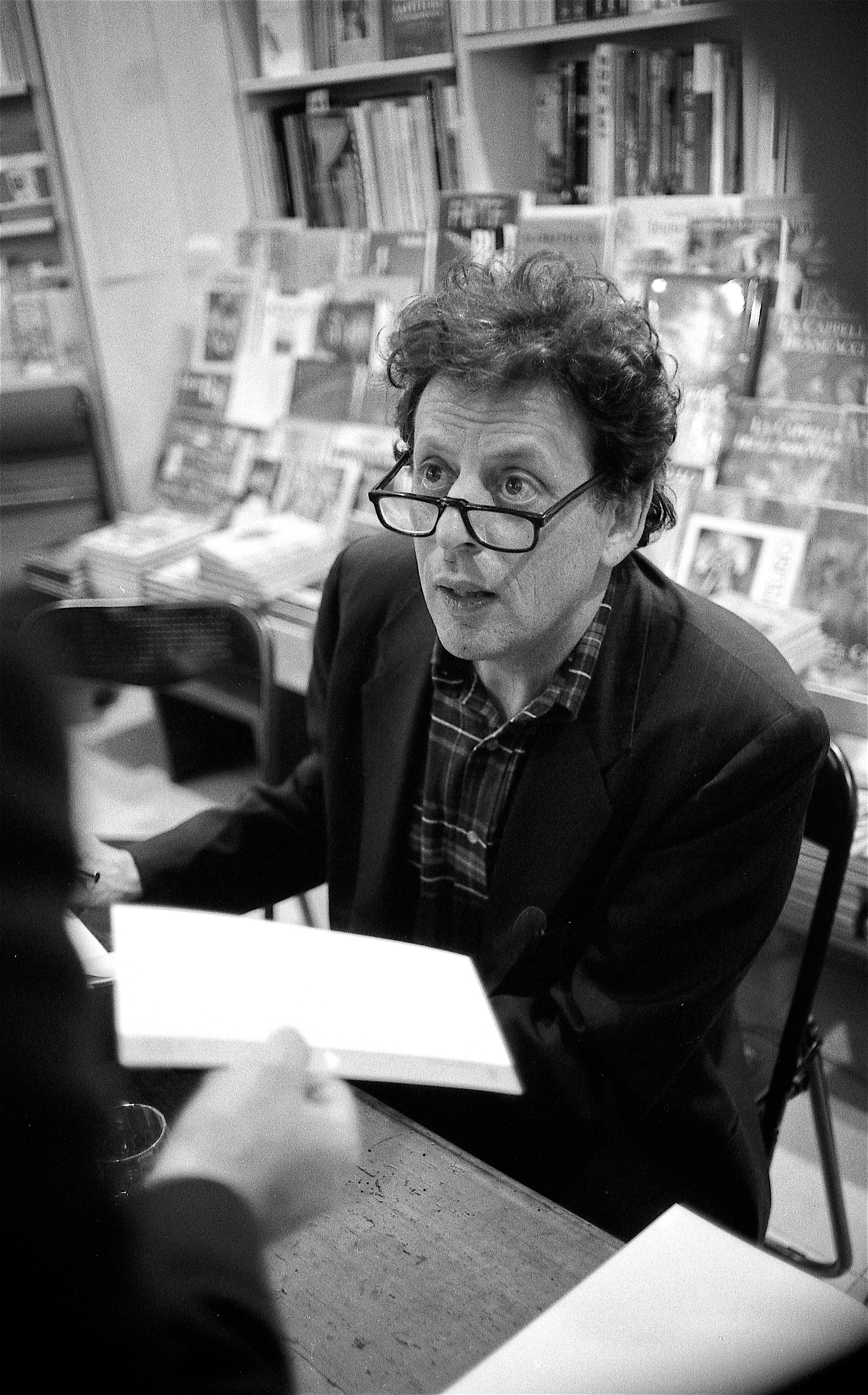
Philip Glass

The Concerto for Harpsichord and Orchestra was completed by Philip Glass in spring of 2002. It was commissioned for the Northwest Chamber Orchestra by Charles and Diana Carey and published by Dunvagen Music. Glass wrote the concerto with the Baroque tradition in mind; however, in order to approach the work in a modern idiom, he calls for a contemporary chamber orchestra to accompany the harpsichord. The concerto was premiered in September 2002 in Seattle, with David Schrader as soloist performing with the Northwest Chamber Orchestra. It is approximately 20 minutes in length. The concerto was included in Glass' Concerto Project, a collection in four volumes.

== Instrumentation ==
This concerto calls for a relatively small chamber orchestra:

- one flute, two oboes, one bassoon
- two horns in F
- violin I, violin II, viola, cello, double bass
- solo harpsichord

== Structure ==
The work is written in the standard three movement concerto format, with a typical fast-slow-fast progression.

=== First Movement ===
The concerto opens on a scale and long trill played by the harpsichord, which first seems to resemble Bach before turning decisively into a recognizably Glass-style configuration of triplets. The orchestra is low at this point, and after perhaps forty seconds, enters the scene with short bursts which aid the harpsichord's rapid spins. The movement slows somewhat into a more lyrical second section, dominated by strings. Soon after horns play quietly, allowing for the soloist to reenter. After a period of development the movement, eight minutes in duration, recalls the Bach-like theme introduced at first, and draws to a close.

=== Second Movement ===
The slower, ten-minute second movement begins with a simple repetitive rhythm by the harpsichord, which after a short duration leads into a lyrical neo-Baroque theme. A brief development ensues. This is followed by a broad statement from the brass, after which the strings and winds introduce the second theme. The statement is repeated after a tremulous harpsichord interlude. Soon afterwards the harpsichord further develops its opening material; it is later joined by the strings, who present a fluctuating, minimalist theme which continues beneath. After a period of approximately two minutes, flutes, bassoon and oboe begin a varied, lengthy partnership while the strings and harpsichord provide a gentle pulse. After a recapitulation of the second theme, the movement draws to a close with a return to the introductory passages.

=== Third Movement ===
The final movement begins with an ecstatic blast from the orchestra, a rapid, major-key theme repeated afterward by the harpsichord. This is followed by playful exchanges between the soloist and the winds; afterward, the strings engage in a complex cycle of triplets with accompaniment by the brass. Rich in counterpoint, this section gives way to a further spiral of brass, with auxiliary support from the harpsichord. The concerto closes in a Haydnesque variation, concluding on a powerful four-note motif Glass also uses to conclude his Cello Concerto No. 1 and his Tirol Piano Concerto. It is probable that Glass was inspired by Rachmaninoff's signature concerto ending, also consisting of four rapid notes.

== Analysis ==
=== Departure from minimalism ===
Although Philip Glass has, albeit controversially, often been labeled as minimalist, the composer dislikes this terminology. This composition is an indication of Glass' recent turn from this label. Evident in his later work is a direction in a more "classical" path; other examples include the Tirol Concerto, the First Cello Concerto, and the Second Piano Concerto. Despite many residual minimalist characteristics throughout the work, such as repetitive triplets and relatively constant pulse, the concerto is tremendously varied, especially in the second movement. Themes are not restated at a noticeably increased amount, and tend to be clustered in groups of two (not unlike the thematic structure of symphonic work by Mozart or Haydn). Glass also concludes in a strong major key, a stylistic decision avoided in many of his earlier pieces.

=== Neo-Baroque ===
This concerto is audibly influenced by the Baroque, a period Glass studied extensively while a student and one from whose repertoire he has often performed. In the opening movement, Glass tips his head to Bach, whose harpsichord concertos are a noted reference in this piece's composition. In addition, the middle movement sponsors a fluid introductory theme which again echoes Bach and perhaps Handel. The closing movement is almost Mozartian in nature, another nod to tradition.

== Performances ==
The work was premiered on September 21, 2002, in Seattle's Benaroya Hall. The soloist was Jillon Stoppels Dupree. The work was included in Volume II of Philip Glass's The Concerto Project

- 2002: Jillon Stoppels Dupree (Harpsichord) and Ralf Gothóni (with Northwest Chamber Orchestra), recorded 2006, released 2006 on The Concerto Project Vol. II (Orange Mountain Music) as "Concerto for Harpsichord and Orchestra" (19:32).
- 2011: Elliot Figg (Harpsichord) and Joel Sachs November 8, 2010 with the New Juilliard Ensemble, New York.
- 2012: Christopher D. Lewis (Harpsichord) and Nicole Paiement March 3, 2012, with the New Music Ensemble of the San Francisco Conservatory of Music.
- 2023: Jillon Stoppels Dupree (harpsichord) with Wesley Schulz conducting members of Seattle Baroque Orchestra and Auburn Symphony Orchestra, May 14, 2023, in the auditorium of Federal Way Performing Arts Center, Washington. An "original instrument" performance, using the same harpsichord Ms.Dupree played at the premiere, with several of the original string players.

== See also ==
- Harpsichord concerto
- List of compositions by Philip Glass
- Minimalism
- Sergei Rachmaninoff
- Avant-garde
- The Concerto Project
- Modernism
- List of twentieth century classical composers
