= Anna Kepe =

American actress

Anna Kepe (born 1977), also known by her married name of Anna Kepe Haas, is a director, actress, producer, pedagogue and entrepreneur. Kepe received her MFA from The Shakespeare Theatre, Academy for Classical Acting in Washington, D.C. under the direction of Michael Kahn.

== Career ==
Kepe directed a performance of German composer Karlheinz Stockhausen's theatrical percussion-ensemble work Musik im Bauch at the Peabody Conservatory in Baltimore, Maryland. No stranger to opera, Kepe created the physical theater movement for the world premier of Donald Knack's (a.k.a. the Junkman) opera Odin. The New York Times described this production as an unqualified success while "raw energy coursed through the piece".

Kepe's cameo appearance on the Macbeth inspired composition The Charm written by composer Michael Udow can be heard on the Equilibrium record label. Kepe combines her Shakespearean expertise and narration with an ensemble instrumentation that includes the world's largest timpani (74"diameter) and 10 sets of 14-foot chimes.

Kepe has been a featured director and teacher at the Aspen Music Festival combining movement with music featuring the music of Dmitri Shostakovich, Alfred Schnittke and Frank Zappa, all combined with original choreography and physical movement, created by Kepe.

Most recently Kepe has created, directed and presented a series of performances of Philip Glass's rendering of the Prelude to Endgame at New York University, the Latvian National Conservatory (Riga) and as a featured artist at the Percussive Arts International Convention in Austin, Texas. Complementing her innovative vision of this Becket's work, she has created an equally compelling interpretation of Sam Shepard's one act play, Tongues having directed and performed this work with internationally renowned percussionist/timpanist Jonathan Haas. Kepe returned from Barbados, W.I. where she directed Mozart's Cosi Fan Tutte at The Holders Season.

Kepe has hosted the Exceptional Young Artists Fund - Gidon Kremer and KREMERATA Baltica Gala Concert at The Purchase Performing Arts Center in Purchase, as well as a benefit concert at the Scandinavia House featuring Gidon Kremer and KREMERata Musica Concert at The Kosciuszko Foundation in NYC. Stephen Pulp's PANGEA featured Kepe at the Page-To-Stage festival at The Kennedy Center, Washington, DC and with Blessed Unrest Theatre Company in NY in ensemble created collaboration The James Wilde Project.

Future projects include directing playwright David Ives's, Philip Glass Buys A Loaf Of Bread at the Loewe Theater, New York University as part of a 70th birthday celebration for Philip Glass, acting in the 365 Days/365 Plays project at the Public Theater.

Kepe coaches privately and has worked with the summer Acting Shakespeare camp and workshops at The Texas Shakespeare Festival.

=== List of acting credits ===
- The White Devil by John Webster playing Vittoria Corombona and directed by Michael Edwards of the Asolo Repertory Theatre;
- Grushenka in The Brothers Karamazov in Washington DC;
- independent feature film TORTURE ME NO MORE in New York;
- principal role in Heineken TV commercial with Ray Liotta for United Kingdom Television;
- 22 DAY ADAGIO at The Mill Mountain Theatre in Virginia;
- Viola in 12th NIGHT in Virginia directed by Diana Denley, artistic director of The Shakespeare's Globe Center Australia;
- reading of LET X at Artomatic in Washington, DC;
- Iphigenia in Aulis at The Symphony Space, New York;
- Marianne / Actress in TRAUMNOVELA at The Barrow Street Theatre in New York and at the West End Theatre, New York;
- Desdemona in OTHELLO with The Mile Square Theatre, directed by Will Pomerantz;
- LET X in Washington, DC;
- Evangeline in DIVINITY BASH / NINE LIVES at The Pantheon Theatre;
- Escalus in Measure for Measure, Off - Broadway at 45 Bleecker/The Culture Project and GBS/RADA, London;
- Lady Macbeth in Macbeth at The Greenwich Street Theatre;
- PRINCESS IVONA at The Horace Mann Theatre;
- HEDDA GABLER at The Theatre at St. Clement's:
- a full season with The Texas Shakespeare Festival.

== Personal life ==
Kepe is married to the timpanist Jonathan Haas.
