= Jonathan Haas =

- Instrument: Timpani
- Website: www.aboutjonathanhaas.com

Jonathan Haas is an American timpanist. Philip Glass' Concerto Fantasy for Two Timpanists and Orchestra was commissioned for him by several orchestras.

== Early life ==
Haas was born circa 1955, raised in Glencoe, Illinois, where his father was CEO of Sealy Posturepedic. After studying liberal arts—including percussion lessons—at Washington University in St. Louis, he trained at the Juilliard School.

While at St. Louis, he played with the St. Louis Symphony, and joined an Emerson, Lake & Palmer tour, opening each show by playing the snare drum part of Maurice Ravel's Boléro, alone in a spotlight. After Juilliard, he joined the Charlotte Symphony Orchestra.

After a self-funded, solo timpani recital at Carnegie Recital Hall in 1980, he accepted an invitation to join the New York Chamber Symphony.

== Glass concerto ==
The Concerto Fantasy for Two Timpanists and Orchestra was commissioned from Philip Glass for Haas by the American Symphony Orchestra, Milwaukee Symphony Orchestra, Peabody Symphony Orchestra, Phoenix Symphony and Saint Louis Symphony Orchestra, jointly. Haas had first suggested the idea of a timpani concerto to Glass almost a decade earlier.

Haas performed the world premiere of the concerto on November 19, 2000, at New York's Lincoln Center with Svetoslav Stoyanovby and the American Symphony Orchestra conducted by Leon Botstein.

He has performed national premieres of the work and recorded it in 2004 with Evelyn Glennie and the Royal Liverpool Philharmonic Orchestra conducted by Gerard Schwarz as part of Glass' Concerto Project. He has also performed versions arranged for chamber orchestra and for wind ensemble.

== 18th Century Concertos ==
Haas is the soloist on all three pieces on the Sunset Records' CD 18th Century Concertos for Timpani and Orchestra:

- Symphony for Eight Timpani and Orchestra - Johann Fischer
- Partita In C Major - Georg Druschetzky
- Concerto For Oboe, Eight Timpani and Orchestra - Georg Druschetzky

These were made with the Bournemouth Sinfonietta, conducted by Harold Farberman and released in 2002.

== Jazz and rock ==
Haas also performs and records as part of his own jazz ensemble, 'Johnny H. and the Prisoners of Swing', whose eponymous CD was released in 2000. Haas formed the group after studying the work of 1920s jazz tympanist Vic Berton, and being given the scores of works for tympani and jazz orchestra by the sister of their composer, Duke Ellington.

He also has a heavy metal band 'Clozshave'.

== Other work ==
Haas is the Director of Instrumental Performance and Percussion Studies at New York University (NYU), as well as the co-director of the NYU Orchestra Program. He teaches the Percussion Program at the Juilliard Pre-College, and on the faculty at the Aspen Music Festival and School. Previously, Haas taught at the Peabody Institute.

He performs with the American Symphony Orchestra, American Composers Orchestra, All-Star Orchestra, New York Pops, and the New Jersey Symphony Orchestra.

Haas played on the Grammy Award-winning Frank Zappa tribute album Zappa's Universe, and played percussion on Steve Vai's Mystery Tracks – Archives Vol. 3.

He is also the owner of Gemini Music Productions, contracting musicians for the New York Pops, Mostly Mozart Festival, All-Star Orchestra, Westchester Philharmonic, and others.

== Personal life ==
Haas has three daughters from his first marriage, and has since remarried, to Anna Kepe.
