= Plutonian Ode =

Poem

"Plutonian Ode" is a poem written by American Beat poet Allen Ginsberg in 1978 against the arms race and nuclear armament of the superpowers. It is heavily inspired by Gnosticism which Ginsberg came to know after reading Hans Jonas's book on the subject.

Philip Glass' Symphony No. 6 is based on and includes parts of this poem.

It was first published in The CoEvolution Quarterly / Journal for the Protection of All Beings co-issue, Fall 1978.
