= Les Enfants terribles (opera) =

1996 chamber opera by Philip Glass

- Opera by Philip Glass
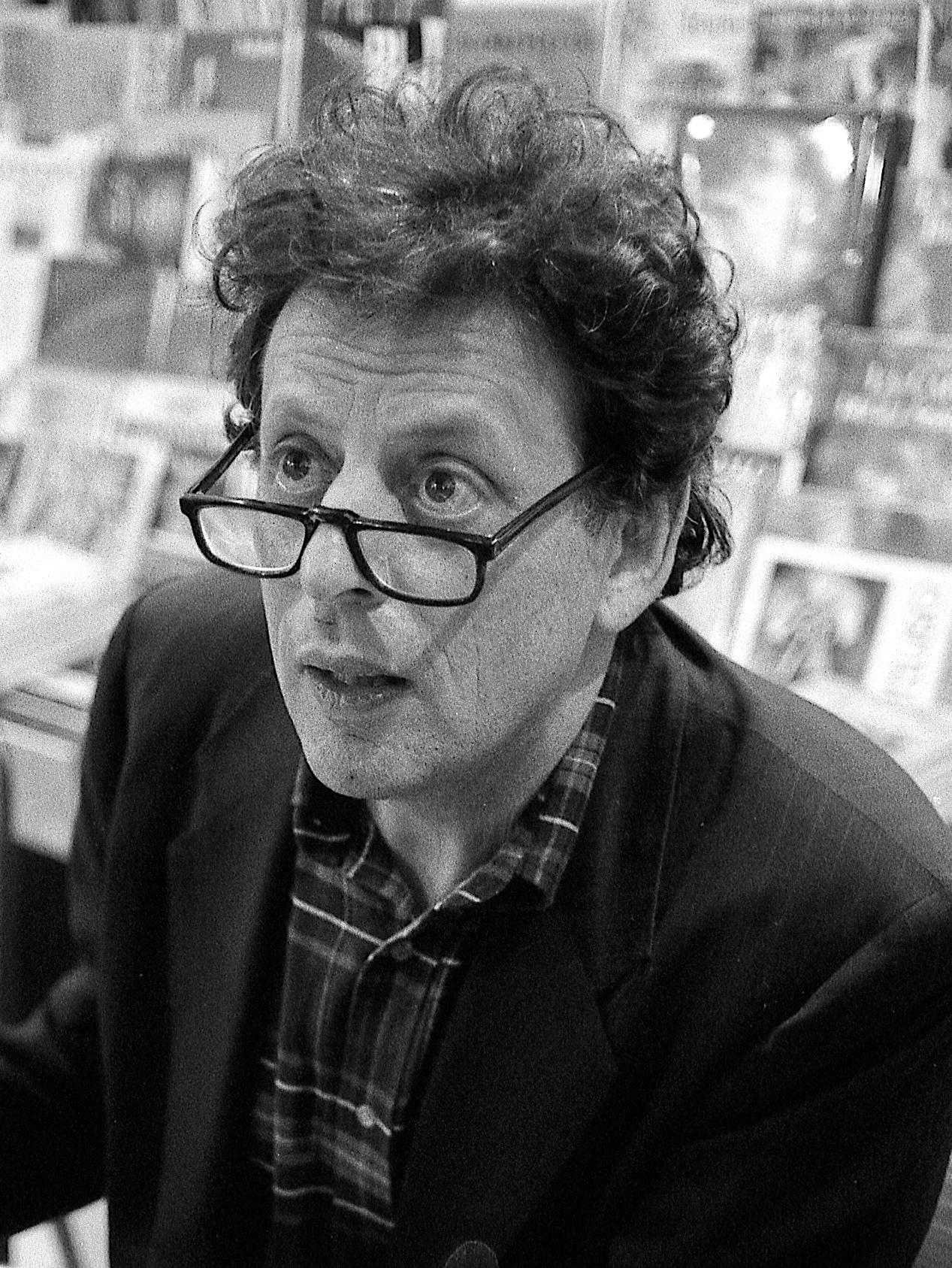
- Glass in 1993
- Language: French; English
- Based on: Les Enfants terribles of Jean Cocteau
- Premiere: 18 May 1996; Theatre Casino, Zug (Switzerland)

Les Enfants terribles is a danced chamber opera for four voices and three pianos (grand pianos or electronic), composed in 1996 by Philip Glass, to a French-language libretto by the composer, in collaboration with the American choreographer Susan Marshall, after Jean Cocteau's eponymous novel published in 1929 and Jean-Pierre Melville's 1950 film. Commissioned by the "Steps" dance festival organized by the Pour-cent culturel Migros in several Swiss cities, this is the last part of a trilogy in homage to the French poet after Orphée (1993) and La Belle et la Bête (1994). The world premiere of the work took place on 18 May 1996 in Zug conducted by Karen Kamensek.

Instead of an orchestra, the score is played by three pianos.

== Roles ==
Roles, voice types, premiere cast
Role	Voice type	Premiere cast, 18 May 1996 Conductor: Karen Kamensek
Paul	bass baritone	Philip Cutlip
Elisabeth	soprano	Christine Arand
Gérard	tenor	Hal Cazalet
Dargelos/Agathe	mezzo-soprano	Valérie Komar

== Synopsis ==
After the death of their mother, Elizabeth and Paul, orphaned brother and sister left to their own devices and bound by an exclusive affection, live together in their large Parisian apartment.

They have built themselves a chimeric universe governed by sibylline symbols. Their room is a real sanctuary where a "treasure" is enthroned with a meaning that is also known only to them. "Elizabeth" met Michael and married him, but the next day he died in an accident without their marriage having been consummated.

She inherited Michael's fortune, including a large private mansion where Paul came to join her with their famous treasure. Gérard, a comrade of Paul and his friend Agathe, who strangely resembles Dargelos (a schoolboy that Paul idolized), soon come to live with them. But when Elizabeth understands that love is born between her brother and Agatha, like a Greek divinity, a kind of Parque, she weaves a Machiavellian web so that her brother cannot escape it. As in all ancient tragedies, the outcome can only be fatal.

Fascinating by the morbid desire carried by the Paul/Elisabeth relationship, this seemingly banal story hides a tragedy: the inevitable end of adolescence, its myths, its grace, its illusions. Elizabeth and Paul die for breaking this law by wanting to eternalize a moment of passage. Indeed, as soon as Dargelos' snowball reaches Paul in the chest, time stops, "the room" begins to live. It became their deserted island, the little piece of land isolated from the rest of the world where they built cabins with their pillows and led a Robinson's existence at night. Their bodies grow, Paul's legs protrude under his sheets, they play at having the desires of grown-ups; but in fact, nothing moves. If they move, it's to rebuild the room immediately. Behind their incessant quarrels, their constant agitation, there is a morbid desire for immobility...

It was Dargelos, the hidden god of this tragedy, who precipitated its outcome by sending a poisoned black ball to Paul, who completed the work of the first snowball. Elizabeth, priestess of the chamber, is only the instrument of fate. By killing herself and her brother, she brings their adolescence into eternity.

== Structure ==
Scenes:

- 1: Ouverture
- 2: Paul est mourant
- 3: Une boule de neige
- 4: Deux moitiés dans un même corps
- 5: Il n’a pas dit au revoir
- 6: Le somnambule
- 7: Elle m’a giflé
- 8a: Ils vivaient leur rêve
- 8b: Et puis laisser
- 9: Appelez-moi Elisabeth
- 11: Modèle entrecroisé
- 11a: Terrible Interlude
- 11: le Verdict
- 13: Interlude Musicale – le Retour chez Orphée
- 14a, b: Cocon de châles
- 15: Perdu
- 16: Il écrivit son propre nom
- 17: Es-tu amoureuse, Agathe?
- 18: De la part de Dargelos
- 19: Elle prit la route
- 20: La fin de Paul

== Performance history ==
The work was also performed in Albertslund, Denmark, on 28 and 29 May 1996 as part of Kulturby 96 when Copenhagen was the European Capital of Culture. It was subsequently performed at the Teatro Olimpico (Roma) on 17 October 1996, at the Brooklyn Academy of Music of New York on 20 November 1996 for the American premiere, at the Alexander Theatre of Helsinki for the Finnish premiere for seven days from 23 September 2005, with the Skaala Opera ensemble conducted by Sasha Mäkilä at the Oakland Opera House on 6 October 2006, at the Maison de la Culture de Bourges for three days from 20 March 2007 for the French premiere, at the Staatstheater Nürnberg for the German premiere for five days from 29 April 2007, and at the Duško Radović Little Theatre of Belgrade (under the title Derišta), on the occasion of the 60th anniversary of the establishment, on 7 December 2009 under the direction of Srđan Marković for the Serbian premiere.

The opera received its UK premiere on 20 August 2010 at the Arcola Theatre, directed by Andrea Ferran. It transferred to the Lilian Baylis Theatre. A second British production, choreographed by Javier de Frutos, with dancers from the Royal Ballet was staged at the Barbican Centre in 2017.

In March 2026 a new production started touring the Netherlands. It was a collaboration between Opera Zuid, the Dutch National Opera, and the Nederlandse Reisopera, featuring talent from the National Opera Studio.

== Recordings ==
- Christine Arand (soprano), Philip Cutlip (bass-baritone), Hal Cazalet (tenor), Valérie Komar (mezzo-soprano), Philip Glass, Nelson Padgett, Eleanor Sandresky (pianos) conducted by Karen Kamensek, recorded in December 1996 and January 1997. Orange Mountain Music (April 2005).
