= Symphony No. 6 (Glass) =

2002 symphony composed by Philip Glass

Symphony No. 6, also known as the Plutonian Ode Symphony, is a symphony composed by Philip Glass. It is based on the poem Plutonian Ode by Allen Ginsberg, parts of which are sung by the soprano soloist in the work. The symphony was commissioned by Carnegie Hall in honor of Glass' 65th birthday and as a vehicle for the talents of soprano Lauren Flanigan. The symphony premiered on February 2, 2002, at Carnegie Hall with Dennis Russell Davies conducting the American Composers Orchestra. The symphony is in three movements, based on the three parts of the poem itself.
