= Violin Concerto No. 2 (Glass) =

2009 violin work by Philip Glass

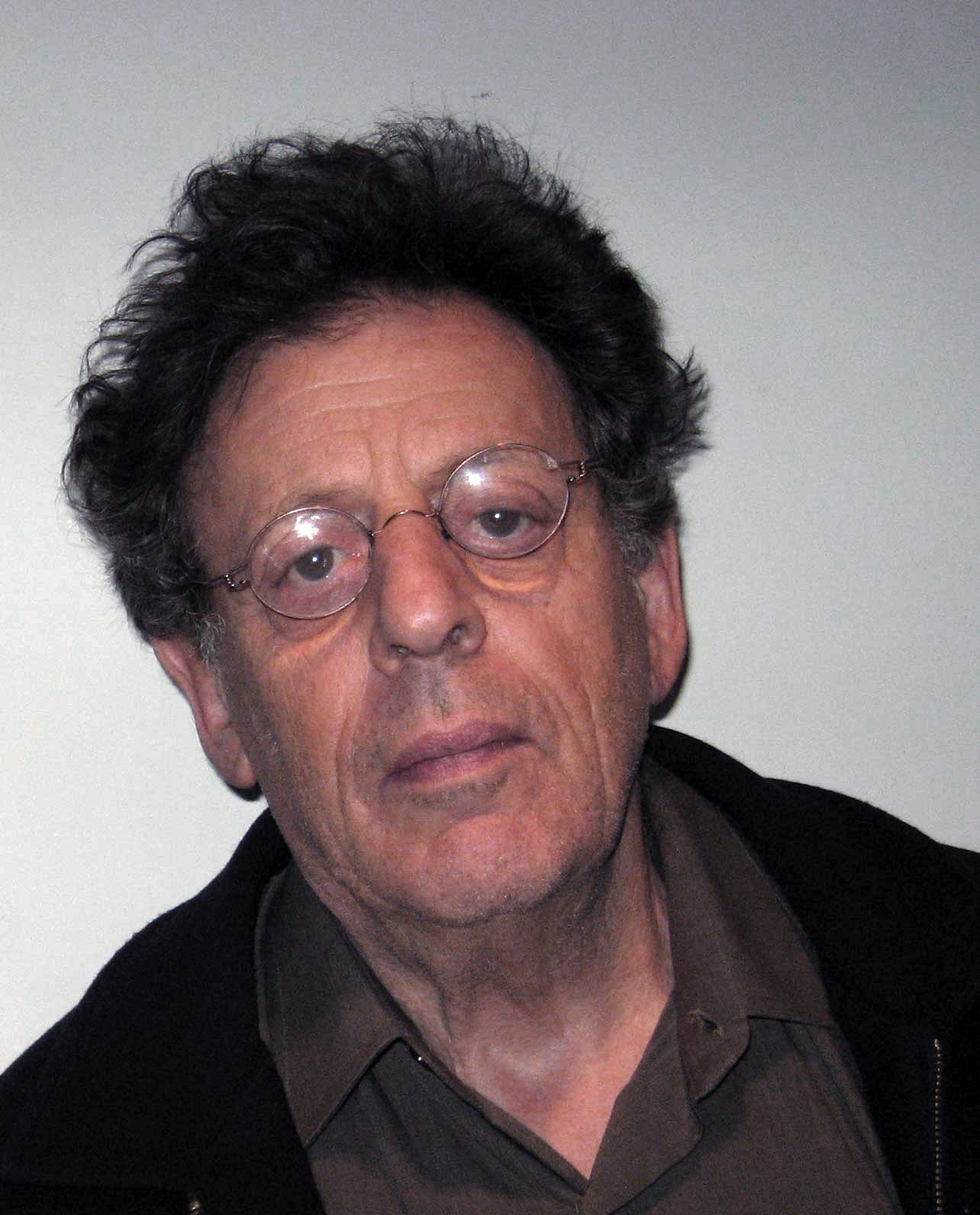
Philip Glass in 2007

Philip Glass' Violin Concerto No. 2, titled The American Four Seasons, received its world premiere in Toronto on December 9, 2009, with violinist Robert McDuffie (for whom the work was composed) and co-commissioner the Toronto Symphony Orchestra under conductor Peter Oundjian. Its European premiere was in London on April 17, 2010, with McDuffie and co-commissioner the London Philharmonic Orchestra under conductor Marin Alsop. Its total duration is around 38 minutes.

== Conception ==
Glass composed the work in the summer and autumn of 2009 after several years of exchanges between him and McDuffie with the idea of creating a piece that would serve as a companion to Vivaldi's The Four Seasons. When the work was presented to McDuffie, it emerged that his interpretation of the seasons was somewhat different from Glass'. For this reason, Glass presents this as an opportunity for the listener to make his/her own interpretation. The titles of the movements therefore offer no clues as to where Spring, Summer, Autumn and Winter might fall, with the composer welcoming other interpretations.

Instead of the cadenza typically found in most violin concertos, Glass provided a number of solo pieces for the violinist, which act as a prelude to the first movement, and three "songs" that precede each of the following three movements. Glass also anticipated that these could be played together as separate concert music when abstracted from the whole work.

This concerto is now in the repertoire of the Kremerata Baltica and was played for the first time in San José, Costa Rica with Gidon Kremer as soloist in August, 2013.

== Structure ==
With exception of the "Prologue," each "song" is played by the soloist, and is accompanied by the orchestra on every movement. The concerto is divided into the following sections:

1. Prologue (solo and 1st violins)
2. Movement 1 (tutti)
3. Song 1 (solo)
4. Movement 2 (tutti)
5. Song 2 (solo)
6. Movement 3 (tutti)
7. Song 3 (solo)
8. Movement 4 (tutti)

== Instrumentation ==
The concerto is scored for solo violin, strings and synthesizer.

== Critical reception ==
Michael White of the Daily Telegraph wrote the following (Cited at Richard Guerin (April 20, 2010)). "'Classic art' ... "This new concerto is unmitigated trash."". philipglass.com. Retrieved February 19, 2018.>:

"Listening to Philip Glass is about as rewarding as chewing gum that’s lost its flavour, and they’re not dissimilar activities. But I did go to the UK premiere of his new violin concerto, more to witness its reception than anything else. And the reception, I’m sorry to say, was rapturous: a standing ovation. Which proves that even if you can’t fool all the people all the time, you can hoodwink a depressing number for a fair while.

This new concerto is unmitigated trash: the usual strung out sequences of arpeggiated banality, driven by the rise and fall of fast-moving but still leaden triplets, and vacuously formulaic. Whatever gives Glass cause to think he can get away with it I can’t imagine (well, perhaps I can: those damned standing ovations). But in this case the offence is the worse for the portentous title he’s appended.

He calls it ‘The American Four Seasons’ – with, you'll note, the definite article: not just ‘a’ but ‘the’. In truth, there are some correspondences of texture, mood and structure that support the title. To a point. But Philip Glass is no Vivaldi, a composer who even at his most wallpaper baroque still has something to say. Glass has nothing – though he presumably deludes himself into thinking he does: hence the preponderance of slow, reflective solo writing in the piece which assumes there's something to reflect on.

An American violinist called Robert McDuffie played the solos with all the dignity he could muster (he's tall, plays in a business suit, looks like a senior vice president at Goldman Sachs: it helps) but you couldn't attribute any distinction to what he did. The tone was scrawny, intonation suspect.

Marin Alsop conducted the LPO who had co-commissioned the piece. The only question on my mind as I left the hall was: Why?"
