= Janice Felty =

American operatic mezzo-soprano

Janice Felty is an American operatic mezzo-soprano. She is known for her interpretations of contemporary composers like John Adams, Philip Glass, John Harbison, and Judith Weir.

In 1987, Felty played the title role in the Handel oratorio Athalia at the Boston Symphony Hall with conductor Christopher Hogwood. In 1991 Felty premiered several roles in John Adams' The Death of Klinghoffer and recorded this work for Nonesuch Records.

She appeared in the première of Steven Stucky's To Whom I Said Farewell with the Los Angeles Philharmonic, the composer conducting, Haydn's Arianna a Naxos with the Santa Fe Chamber Music Festival and most recently Colin Matthews’ Continuum with the Los Angeles Philharmonic under Esa-Pekka Salonen. Maestro Salonen and she repeated the work in January, 2006, with the Chicago Symphony's MusicNOW series.
