= Violin Concerto No. 1 (Glass) =

1987 violin work by Philip Glass

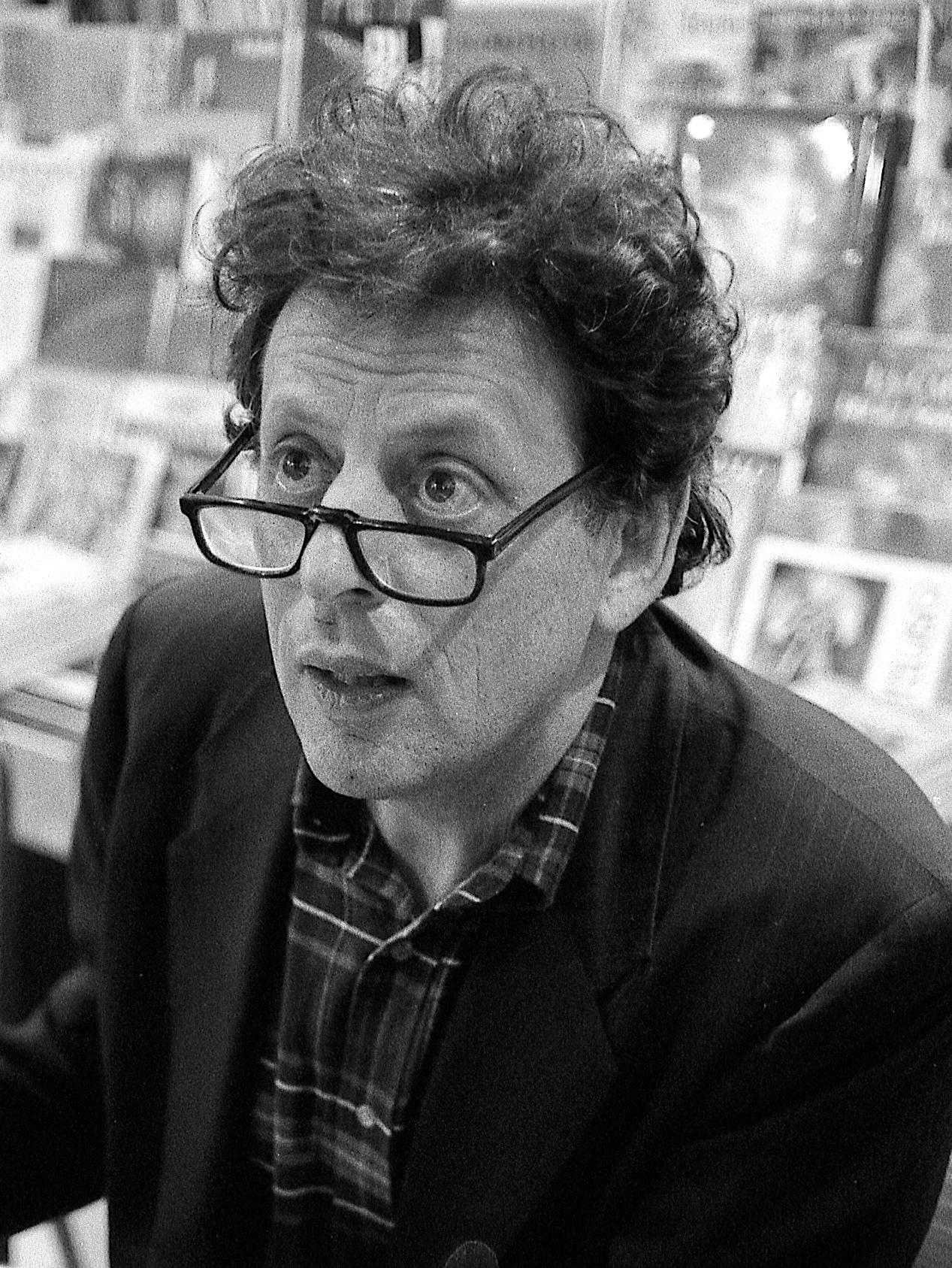
Philip Glass in 1993

Philip Glass's Violin Concerto No. 1 was commissioned by the American Composers Orchestra for soloist Paul Zukofsky and premiered in New York City on 5 April 1987. The work was composed with Glass's late father in mind. The piece quickly became one of Glass's most popular works. It is usually around 25–30 minutes in duration when performed.

== Conception ==
Following Glass's early operas, the conductor Dennis Russell Davies had been urging the composer to write more orchestral pieces, and the concerto marks Glass's first full-scale venture into non-theatrical orchestral composing.

Glass's original concept was for a five-movement work, and Zukofsky requested a slow, high finale. As the composition process developed, however, Glass decided that five movements were too many and settled for a more conventional three-movement format. According to Glass, this traditional structure was not a concession to formality but simply a result of the work finding "a voice of its own" as the first and second movements developed into longer pieces than he had originally conceived.

The work was composed with Glass's father, Ben, in mind, despite the latter's death some sixteen years earlier: "I wrote the piece in 1987 thinking, let me write a piece that my father would have liked [...] A very smart nice man who had no education in music whatsoever, but the kind of person who fills up concert halls. [...] It's popular, it's supposed to be — it's for my Dad."

== Instrumentation ==
The concerto is scored for solo violin; two flutes (one doubling piccolo), two oboes, two B♭ clarinets, E♭ clarinet, bass clarinet, two bassoons; four horns, three trumpets, two tenor trombones, bass trombone, tuba; timpani, snare drum, bass drum, wood block, triangle, cymbals, harp and strings.

== Structure ==
Metronome indication in quarter notes per minute:

1. = 104 — = 120
2. = c. 108 or c. 96
3. = c. 150 — Coda: Poco meno = 104

=== Movement I ===
The first movement is characterized by a series of light, pulsing chords that reappear periodically throughout the movement, with slight variations with each recurrence. The solo violin enters early in the movement playing fairly rapid arpeggios that gradually extend to encompass the full range of the instrument. There follows a brief repeat of the opening chord motif, then the brass section enters with a pattern of tightly harmonized chords from which the violin draws a high melody. The piece then plunges into an intense churning pattern, with full orchestra accompanying the violin into more complex arpeggiated material before returning again to the pulsing chord motif. The movement progresses by revisiting and varying these elements, at the same time introducing an octave-leap motion to the solo violin line that prefigures the main characteristic of the second movement. The movement closes with a diminuendo recapitulation of the violin's opening motif.

=== Movement II ===
The second movement opens with a sequence of broken chords, and the low strings and woodwind begin a descending ground bass pattern that they will repeat for the duration of the movement. The rest of the orchestra is introduced over the subsequent repetitions of the ground bass, accumulating layers of harmony. Once this is established, the violin enters with a series of high motifs—one legato, consisting mainly of repeated sustained notes and two of arpeggiated figures. Once established, these motifs are shared equally between the soloist and the orchestra, with the soloist playing one while the orchestra plays one of the others, shifting the motif between sections of the orchestra. The focus gently shifts between the soloist and the orchestra, with neither dominating the other or competing for focus. The movement peaks at its halfway point and the harmonic layers disappear one by one, the violin oscillating between the perfect fifth in two octaves, without settling on the tonic.

=== Movement III ===
After lingering on a single chord for a brief period the orchestra breaks into a rhythm of Latin American origin, along with untuned wooden percussion. With the introduction of the violin, the movement enters a dance-like sequence that repeatedly approaches a cadence only to turn away from resolution at the last moment. Out of the dance segment emerges the slow finale requested by Zukofsky: the tempo drops and a variation of the pulsing chord motif from the first movement enters to support the violin as it plays a soft closing theme that recapitulates the main material of the second movement.

== Reception ==
The piece quickly became one of Glass's most popular works, and appears on a number of recordings. Gidon Kremer, the first soloist to record the work, says the concerto "is a work typical of Glass, in which a certain enigmatic drive allows the performer to feel both bound to strict rhythm and free in his fantasy". The success of the concerto inspired Glass to branch out into yet more orchestral writing: his first fully formed work for orchestra alone, The Light, emerged in the same year as the violin concerto and was followed by a proliferation of concertos and symphonies over the following years. Brazilian flautist James Strauss transcribed the piece for flute, with encouragement from Philip Glass.

== Legacy ==
Passages from the concerto feature prominently in the "brooding" soundtrack of Emmanuel Carrère's French-language film of 2005, La Moustache.

== Recordings ==
Notable recordings of this composition include:

Violin	Conductor	Orchestra	Record Company	Year of Recording	Format
Gidon Kremer	Christoph von Dohnányi	Vienna Philharmonic	Deutsche Grammophon	1992	CD
Robert McDuffie	Christoph Eschenbach	Houston Symphony	Telarc	1998	CD
Adele Anthony	Takuo Yuasa	Ulster Orchestra	Naxos	1999	CD
Renaud Capuçon	Dennis Russell Davies	Bruckner Orchester Linz	Orange Mountain Music	2016	CD
David Nebel	Kristjan Järvi	London Symphony Orchestra	Sony Classical	2018	CD
Anne Akiko Meyers	Gustavo Dudamel	Los Angeles Philharmonic	Platoon	2024	Digital

== Sources ==
- Maycock, Robert (2002). Glass: A Portrait. Sanctuary. ISBN 978-1-86074-347-4.
