= Paul Barnes (pianist) =

American pianist (born 1961)

Paul Barnes (born 1961) is an American pianist. He concentrates particularly on the work of Liszt; Barnes also has worked extensively with Philip Glass, whose Piano Concerto No. 2 he premiered in 2004 at the Lied Center for Performing Arts. Barnes teaches at University of Nebraska–Lincoln school of music. He also teaches summer courses at the Vienna International Piano Academy.
