= Tirol Concerto for Piano and Orchestra =

2000 piano concerto by Philip Glass

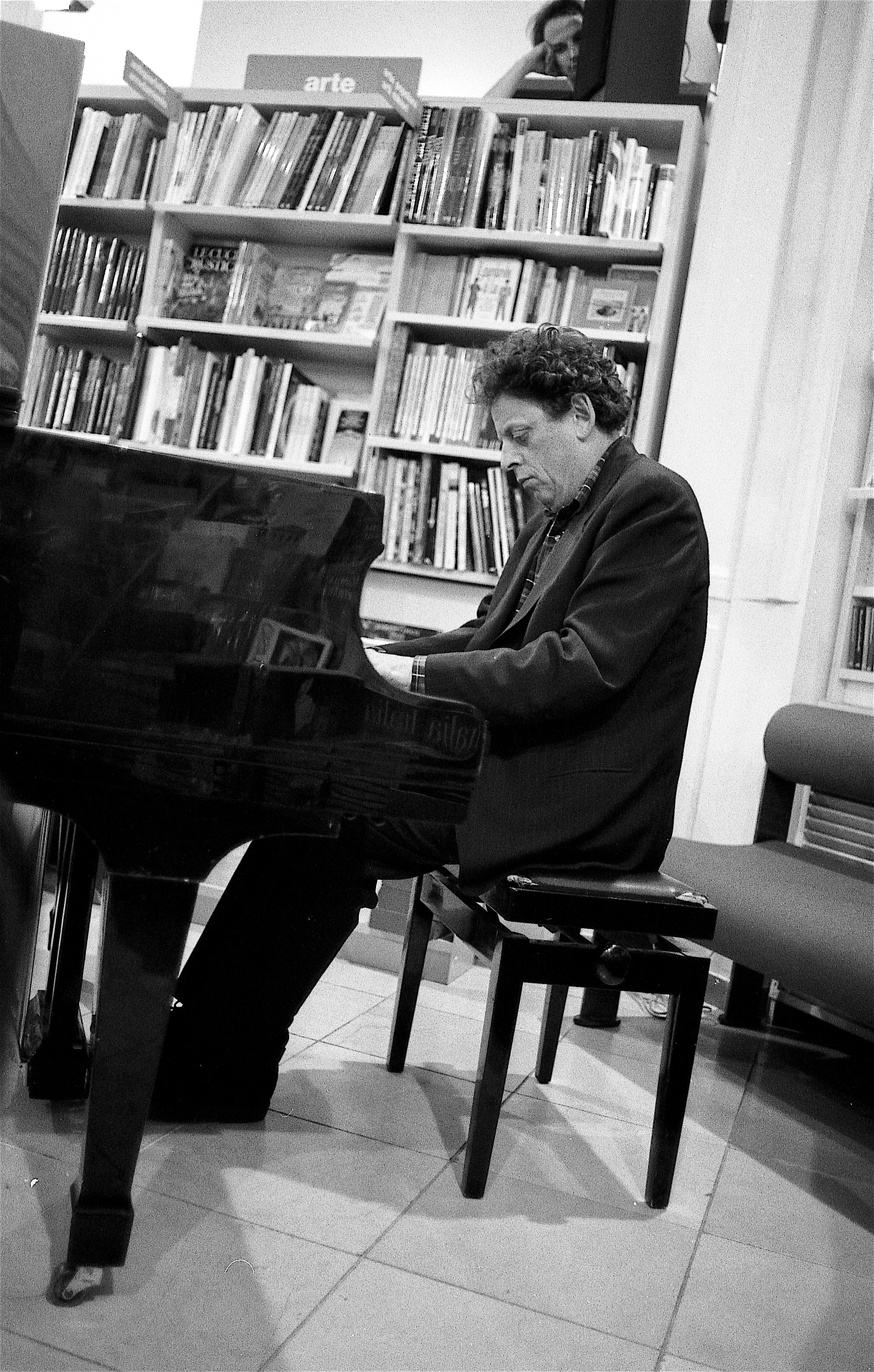
Philip Glass performing in Florence, Italy in 1993

The Tirol Concerto for Piano and Orchestra (also known as the Piano Concerto No. 1) is a piano concerto by Philip Glass. The composer wrote the work in 2000. On commission by the Klangspuren in Schwaz, it was written for the Stuttgarter Kammerorchester. It is one of eight concerti in Glass' series The Concerto Project, an amalgamation of works in four volumes.

== Structure ==
The piece is scored for solo piano, accompanied by string orchestra. Several recordings of the concerto have been made. The concerto is in three movements, the middle being the longest. An analysis by musicologist student Wilhelm Delport in 2015 rediscovered that the first and third movements borrow heavily from a Tyrolean Volkslied named, Maria! Hilf mir doch! (de), found in the Tyrolean Music Archive catalogue number A7249. He also determined that the second composition is likely an expansion of the piece Raising the Sail from the motion picture soundtrack to The Truman Show (1998), which Glass also composed a few years earlier.
