= The Knights (orchestra) =

New York-based orchestra

- Orchestra
- Founded: Late 1990s
- Location: New York City, New York USA
- Website: Official website

The Knights are a New York–based orchestra founded by brothers Eric and Colin Jacobsen. While music students in the late 1990s, the brothers were interested in performing classical and modern music. These gatherings turned into public recitals and the ensemble The Knights of the Many-Sided Table was formed. As the number of performances increased and the group grew, the original collaborative spirit of chamber music remained. The name – now simply "The Knights" – has symbolized the orchestra’s quest: always searching out something bold and true to the music.

== History ==
Members of The Knights are composers, arrangers, singer-songwriters, and improvisers who bring a range of cultural influences to the group from baroque and classical performance practice to jazz and klezmer genres to pop and indie rock music. Every player contributes in the rehearsal process and each is committed to rehearsing the music as much as it deserves. This forum for radical inquiry and in-depth preparation serves as the foundation for The Knights, which is supported by the strong camaraderie built over years of friendship.

Beginning in 2004, the ensemble received invitations from several New York presenters including Bargemusic and Friends of the Arts’ Beethoven Festival. In 2007, The Knights presented an acclaimed Weill Hall debut as well as its first international tour of Ireland. Also in 2007, the Jacobsens established and incorporated Music Forward, an organization that sponsors unique projects or groups, including The Knights. The Knights have performed continuously, since 2009, with the Naumburg Orchestral Concerts, in the Naumburg Bandshell, Central Park, in the summer series.

The orchestra has collaborated with leading artists such as Dawn Upshaw, Joe Gramley, Susan Narucki, Gil Shaham, singer-songwriter (and Knights violinist) Christina Courtin, Iranian ney virtuoso Siamak Jahangiri, fiddler Mark O'Connor, and Syrian clarinetist/composer Kinan Azmeh. The Knights have served as the resident chamber orchestra of the MATA Festival for young composers, premiering new works by Christopher Tignor and Prix-de-Rome winner Yotam Haber, and worked closely with composers Lisa Bielawa, Ljova, and Osvaldo Golijov.

The Knights have recorded two albums for Sony Classical, Experience: Live from New York with cellist Jan Vogler, and New Worlds. They are represented by Opus3 Artists. The orchestra signed an exclusive artist contract with Warner Classics, with its label debut the ground beneath our feet released in April 2015.
