= Songs from the Trilogy =

Studio album by Philip Glass
- Released: August 7, 1989
- Recorded: 1978 (Einstein on the Beach); 1984 (Satyagraha); 1987 (Akhnaten)
- Genre: Classical
- Length: 53:44
- Label: CBS Records
- Producer: Philip Glass and Kurt Munkacsi (Einstein on the Beach); Kurt Munkacsi and Michael Riesman (Satyagraha); Kurt Munkacsi and Michael Riesman (Akhnaten)
- Compiler: Kurt Munkacsi for Euphorbia Productions, Ltd.

Songs from the Trilogy is a 1989 compilation album of songs from Philip Glass’ operas Einstein on the Beach, Satyagraha, and Akhnaten. Many of the songs on the album have been altered or shortened from their original composition.

== Track listing ==
1. "Protest" - 4:19 (Satyagraha)
2. "Evening Song" - 4:07 (Satyagraha)
3. "Hymn to the Sun" - 6:16 (Akhnaten)
4. "Trial/Prison" - 2:47 (Einstein on the Beach) (shortened version of I Feel the Earth Move)
5. "Akhnaten & Nefertiti" - 4:15 (Akhnaten)
6. "Kuru Field of Justice" - 6:04 (Satyagraha)
7. "Knee" - 3:32 (Einstein on the Beach)
8. "Tolstoy Farm" - 4:54 (Satyagraha)
9. "Window of Appearances" - 4:22 (Akhnaten)
10. "Bed" - 3:40 (Einstein on the Beach)
11. "Epilogue" - 4:18 (Akhnaten)
12. "Knee 5" - 5:10 (Einstein on the Beach)
