= Einstein on the Beach =

1976 opera by Robert Wilson and Philip Glass

- Opera by: Robert Wilson; Philip Glass
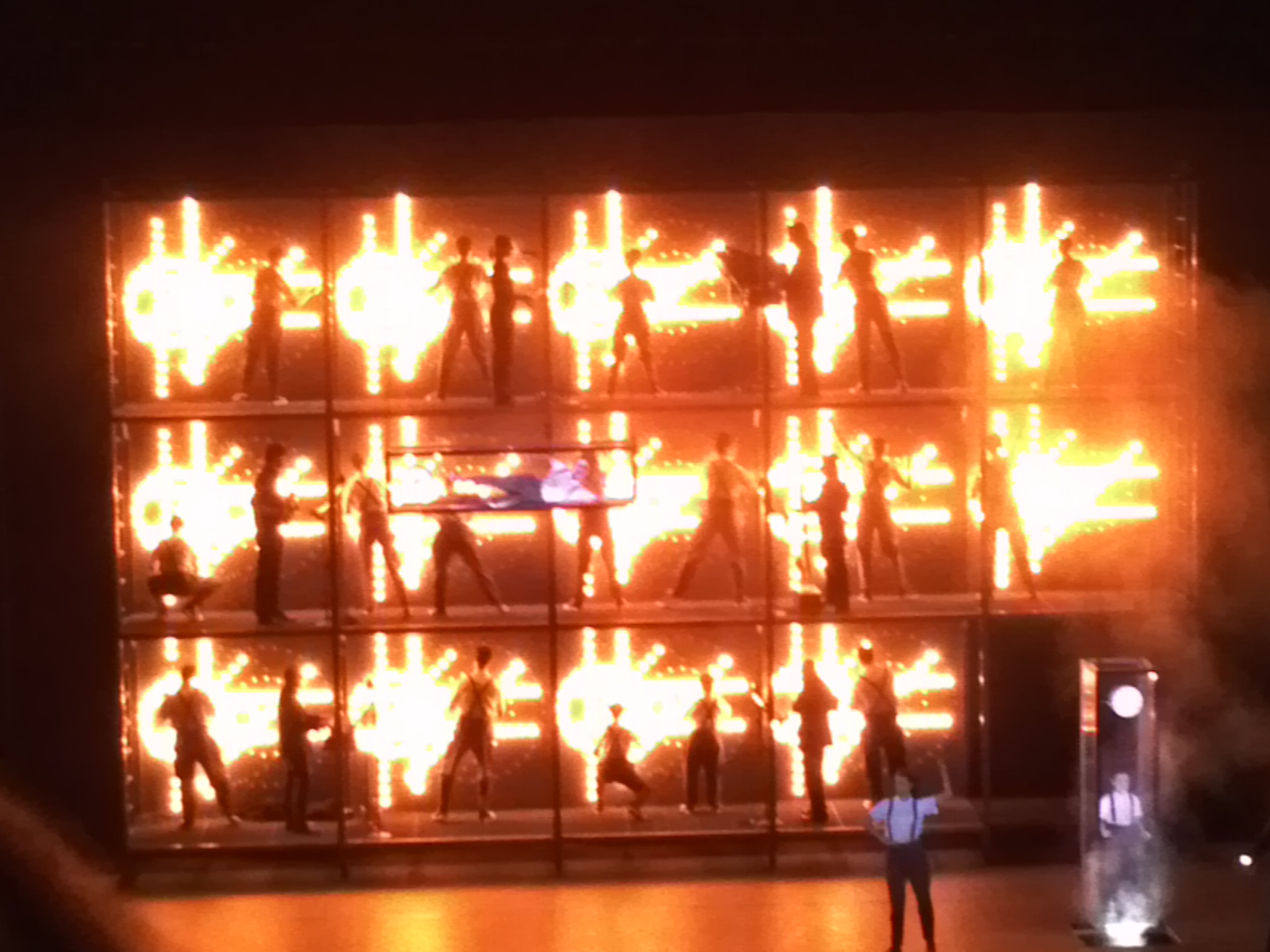
- A 2012 production
- Librettist: Christopher Knowles; Samuel M. Johnson; Lucinda Childs
- Premiere: July 25, 1976; 50 years ago Théâtre Municipal; Avignon, France

Einstein on the Beach is an opera in four acts by Robert Wilson with music composed by Philip Glass. The opera eschews traditional narrative in favor of a formalist approach based on structured spaces laid out by Wilson in a series of storyboards which are framed and connected by five "knee plays" or intermezzos.

The opera's premiere occurred on July 25, 1976, at the Théâtre Municipal in Avignon, France, as part of the Avignon Festival. The opera contains writings by Christopher Knowles, Samuel M. Johnson and Lucinda Childs. It is Glass's first and longest opera score, taking approximately five hours in full performance without intermission; given the length, the audience is permitted to enter and leave as desired.

The work became the first in Glass's thematically related Portrait Trilogy, along with Satyagraha (1979), and Akhnaten (1983). These three operas were described by Glass as portraits of people whose personal vision transformed the thinking of their times through the power of ideas rather than by military force.

== Composition and performance history ==
Glass and Wilson first met to discuss the prospects of a collaborative work, and decided on an opera of between four and five hours in length based around a historical persona. Wilson initially suggested Charlie Chaplin or Adolf Hitler, whom Glass outright rejected, while Glass proposed Mahatma Gandhi (later the central figure of his 1979 opera Satyagraha). Albert Einstein was the eventual compromise. The title appears to reference the apocalyptic novel On the Beach by Nevil Shute. The opera was originally to be titled Einstein on the Beach on Wall Street but was later shortened; neither Glass nor Wilson remember when or why.

The music was written in 1975 while Glass was in Cape Breton, Nova Scotia. Glass recounts the collaborative process: "I put [Wilson’s notebook of sketches] on the piano and composed each section like a portrait of the drawing before me. The score was begun in the spring of 1975 and completed by the following November, and those drawings were before me all the time."

=== 1976 premiere and first tour ===
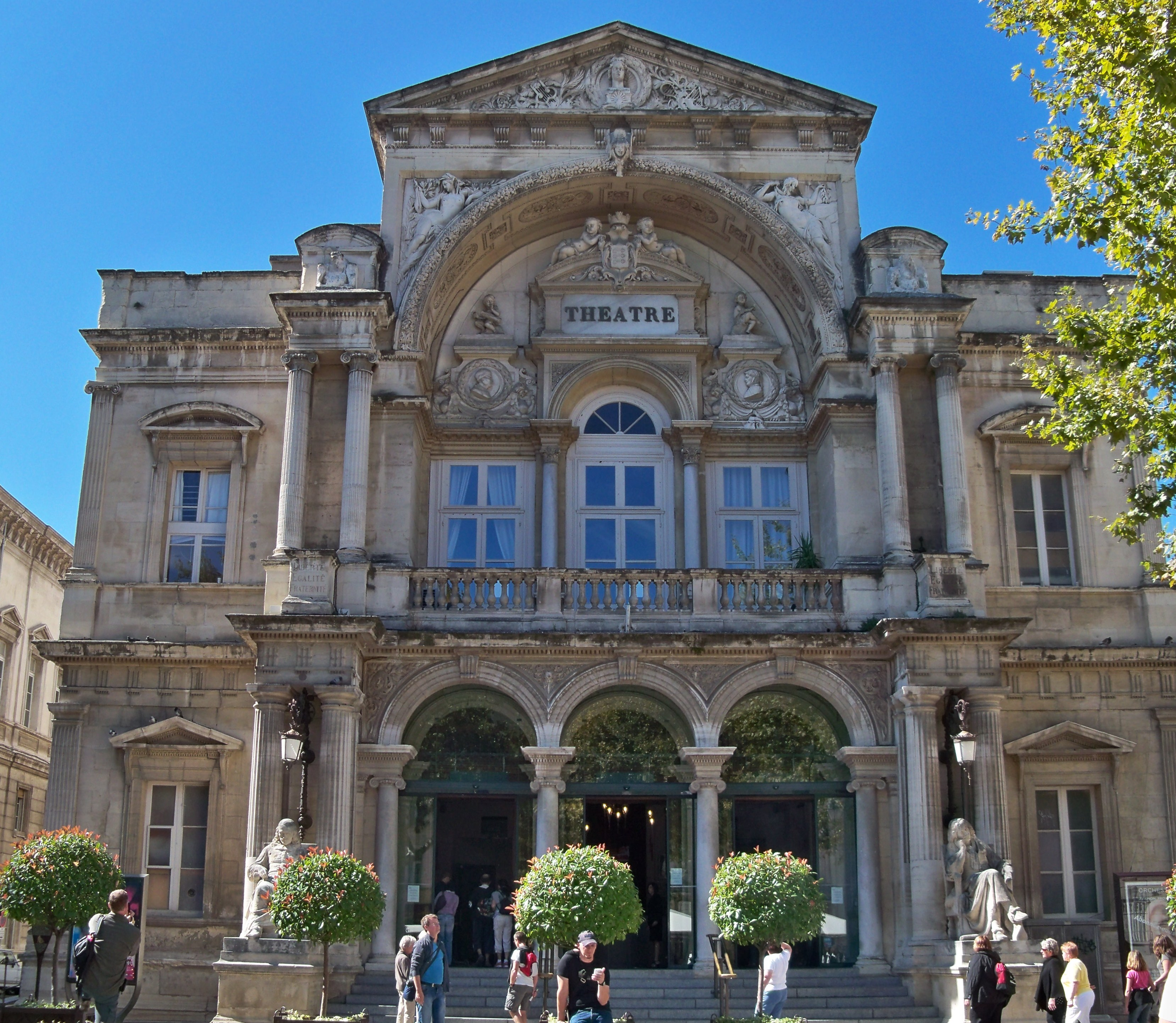
Théâtre Municipal in Avignon, France, site of the opera's 1976 premiere

Einstein on the Beach premiered on July 25, 1976, at the Théâtre Municipal in Avignon, France, as part of the Avignon Festival. It was performed by the Philip Glass Ensemble and presented by the Byrd Hoffmann Foundation. The opera was also staged that summer in Hamburg, Paris, Belgrade, Venice, Brussels and Rotterdam. The Byrd Hoffman Foundation in cooperation with the Metropolitan Opera held two performances in November 1976. Lucinda Childs, Robert Wilson, pupil Sheryl S. Sutton, and Samuel M. Johnson filled the primary characters. All three would go on to reappear in the 1984 BAM revival.

=== 1980s ===
The Brooklyn Academy of Music (BAM) next mounted the opera in 1984. A one-hour documentary about this production appeared on public television, titled Einstein on the Beach: The Changing Image of Opera. The documentary was shown at the Morgan Library & Museum during its exhibition “Robert Wilson/Philip Glass: Einstein on the Beach” which ran from July 13 through November 4, 2012.

In 1988, opera director Achim Freyer, who had staged the world premiere of Glass's Akhnaten in Stuttgart, Germany in 1984, designed and staged a reworked version in a highly abstract style, with new spoken texts from the early 20th century, at the Stuttgart State Opera. As with the premiere, this version was also conducted by Michael Riesman.

=== 1990s ===
In 1992, a revival was mounted by International Production Associates that included the participation of Wilson, Glass and Childs. The production was re-staged at the McCarter Theatre at Princeton University. It subsequently toured to Frankfurt, Melbourne, Barcelona, Madrid, Tokyo, Brooklyn (BAM), and Paris.

=== 2000s ===
In 2007, Carnegie Hall presented a concert version of Einstein in which violinist Tim Fain appeared as soloist. The New York Times wrote about his performance, "And Tim Fain, the violinist, gave the solo passages in the second, fourth and fifth 'Knee Plays' and in the climactic, swirling 'Spaceship Interior' scene an electrifying, virtuosic workout." Fain tours extensively with Philip Glass in duo recitals and they always include the solo from "Knee Play 2" on their program.

=== 2010s ===
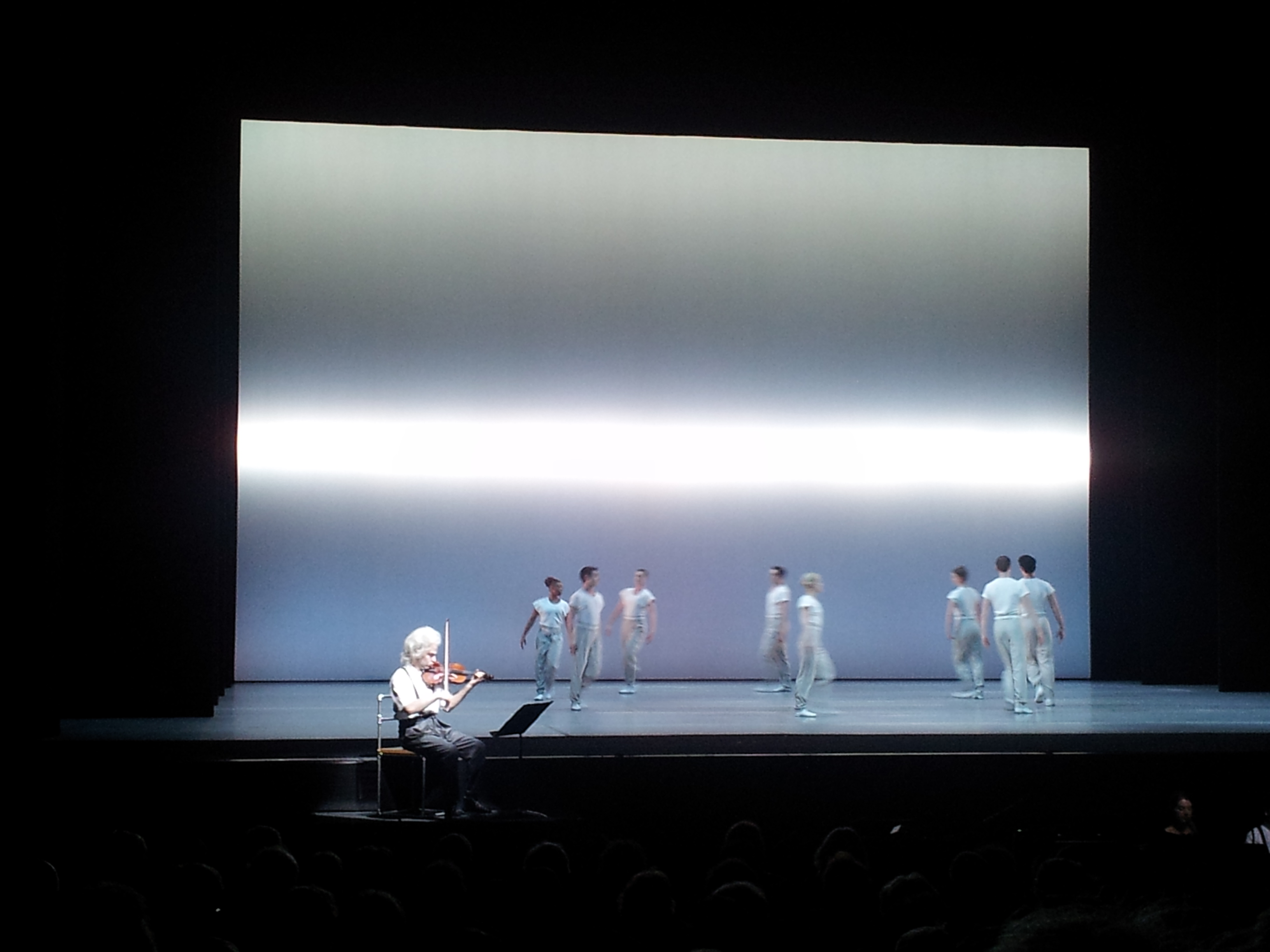
Scene from the opera performed 10 January 2013

A revival with the participation of all the original collaborators was commissioned by the New York City Opera (NYCO) to open their 2009–10 season. When general manager designate Gerard Mortier withdrew from NYCO, the revival, along with the rest of Mortier's programming, was canceled.

The team that had organized the New York City Opera production put together another group to remount Einstein, under the management of Pomegranate Arts. After a month of rehearsals overseen by Glass, Wilson and Childs, the first performance in 20 years took place on January 20, 2012, presented by the University Musical Society at the Power Center for the Performing Arts on the campus of the University of Michigan in Ann Arbor. Two additional performances that weekend followed. The performance featured Kate Moran and Helga Davis replacing Childs' and Sutton's roles respectively. Grammy Award-nominated violinist Jennifer Koh played the role of Einstein in the preview and alternated with Antoine Silverman for the subsequent tour. The other instrumental performers and solfege soprano for these performances are the current members of the Philip Glass Ensemble without Glass himself performing. The performers in the 2012 production included members of the Lucinda Childs Dance Company: Ty Boomershine, Vincent McCloskey, Matthew Pardo, Patrick O'Neill, Stuart Singer, Lonnie Poupard, Caitlin Scranton, Sharon Milanese, Katie Dorn, Katherine Helen Fisher, Anne Lewis, Shakirah Stewart, and Sarah Hillmon. The chorus for this revival was composed of sopranos Michèle Eaton, Melanie Russell, Lindsay Kesselman; altos Hai-Ting Chinn, Solange Merdinian, Kate Maroney; tenors John Kawa, Philip Anderson, Tomas Cruz; and basses Greg Purnhagen, Joe Damon Chappel, and Jason Charles Walker.

The official tour began on March 16, 2012, after a single preview the previous evening with the premiere at the Opéra Berlioz in Montpellier, France. This was followed by performances at the Teatro Valli in Reggio Emilia, Italy; the Barbican Centre, London; the Sony Centre for the Performing Arts, Toronto; the Brooklyn Academy of Music Brooklyn, New York; Zellerbach Hall at the University of California, Berkeley, California; the Teatro del Palacio de Bellas Artes, Mexico City: in 2013, at Het Muziektheater/De Nederlandse Opera, Amsterdam; Hong Kong Cultural Centre, Hong Kong; Arts Centre Melbourne, Melbourne, Australia; Los Angeles Opera, Los Angeles: and, in 2014 there were performances in Paris and Berlin. In October 2015 this production came to an end with performances in Gwangju, South Korea.

This touring production of Einstein on the Beach was commissioned by: BAM; the Barbican, London; Cal Performances with the University of California, Berkeley; Luminato – Toronto Festival of Arts and Creativity; De Nederlandse Opera/The Amsterdam Music Theatre; Opéra national de Montpellier Languedoc-Roussillon; and the University Musical Society of the University of Michigan.

From July 13 through November 4, 2012, the Morgan Library & Museum exhibited “Robert Wilson/Philip Glass: Einstein on the Beach” which displayed Glass's score and Wilson's designs from the 1976 premiere. Excerpts from the New York rehearsals and later performances were also shown.

Culturebox, a digital production dedicated to cultural content for French Television, streamed a live performance from Théâtre du Châtelet on January 7, 2014, and made it available as streaming video for the next six months only. This was the first time the opera was filmed.

A new staging of Einstein on the Beach premiered at the Opernhaus Dortmund, Germany, in April 2017. It was directed by Kay Voges and was the first production without Glass or Wilson personally involved. The opera was also staged at the Grand Théâtre de Genève in 2019 as part of La Batie performing arts festival. That production was directed by Daniele Finzi Pasca.

=== 2020s ===
From November 19 through November 21, 2026 the Brooklyn Academy of Music (BAM) commemorated the 50th anniversary of the opera and Philip Glass's upcoming 90th birthday with a concert staging of selected portions of Einstein on the Beach with the Philip Glass Ensemble, conducted by the ensemble's music director, Michael Riesman. This was the first time a production of Einstein at BAM did not involve Glass or Robert Wilson. The concert was about 2 hours and 55 minutes in length with an intermission. Featured performers were actor Key Grant Kauffman and violinist Allayta Foon Dancoes. The chorus members were Philip Anderson, Joe Chappel, Tomás Cruz, Katie Geissinger, Oriana Hawley, Britt Hewitt, John Kawa, Kate Maroney, Gregory Purnhagen, Peter Steward, Azalea Twining and Piper Weldon. The production included an installation by artist and stage designer Es Devlin, and lighting design by Marc Heimendinger.

A new staging of Einstein on the Beach is scheduled to premiere in May 2027 at Aviva Studios in Manchester, England, followed by a North American premiere in September 2027 at the Park Avenue Armory in New York City. The director is Phelim McDermott, who has also directed performances of the other operas in Glass' Portrait Trilogy, Akhnaten and Satyagraha. The conductor is Brad Lubman, and the designer is Tom Pye. The production has been commissioned by the English National Opera, Factory International, Park Avenue Armory and the UK theatre group Improbable, in association with Scene and Heni Koenigsberg Productions LLC, and in partnership with the BBC Philharmonic Orchesta.

== Synopsis ==
From the beginning of Glass and Wilson's collaboration, they insisted on portraying the icon purely as a historical figure, in the absence of a storyline attached to his image. While they did incorporate symbols from Einstein's life within the opera's scenery, characters, and music, they intentionally chose not to give the opera a specific plot. This is in accord with Wilson's formalist approach, which he asserts creates more truth on stage than naturalist theater. Wilson structured Einstein on the Beach as a repeating sequence of three different kinds of space. Between major acts are shorter entr'actes known as "knee plays," a signature technique that Wilson has applied throughout his oeuvre. Propelling idea of "non-plot" within Einstein on the Beach, its libretto employs solfège syllables, numbers, and short sections of poetry. In an interview, Glass comments that he originally intended for his audience to construct personal connections with Einstein as a character and with the music that he assigns to the icon. For example, the music within the first of the opera's "Knee Plays" features repeated numbers accompanied by an electric organ. Glass states that these numbers and solfège syllables were used as placeholders for texts by the singers to memorize their parts, and were kept instead of replacing them with texts. This numerical repetition, however, offers an interpretation as a reference to the mathematical and scientific breakthroughs made by Einstein himself. Of further reference to the icon's image, everything on the originally staged set of Einstein on the Beach, from costumes to lighting, depicts specific aspects that refer to Einstein's life.

Overall, the music assigned to Einstein demonstrates a circular process, a repeating cycle that constantly delays resolution. This process uses both additive and subtractive formulas. The three main scenes within the opera—"Train", "Trial", and "Field/Spaceship"—allude to Einstein's hypotheses about his theory of relativity and his unified field theory. Specifically, themes within the opera allude to nuclear weapons, science, and AM radio.

The opera consists of nine connected 20-minute scenes in four acts separated by "Knee Plays". Five "Knee Plays" frame the opera's structure and appear in between acts, while also functioning as the opening and closing scenes. Glass defines a "Knee Play" as an interlude between acts and as "the 'knee' referring to the joining function that humans' anatomical knees perform". While the "Knee Plays" helped to create the necessary time to change the scenery of Wilson's seven sets, these interludes also served a musical function. David Cunningham, a Glass scholar, writes that the intermittence of Glass's "Knee Plays" amongst the opera's four acts, serves as a "constant motif in the whole work".

The opera requires a cast of two female, one male, and one male child in speaking roles (for the Wilson production); a 16-person SATB chamber chorus with an outstanding soprano soloist and a smaller tenor solo part; three reed players: flute (doubling piccolo and bass clarinet), soprano saxophone (doubling flute), tenor saxophone (doubling alto saxophone and flute); solo violin, and two synthesizers/electronic organs. The orchestration was originally tailored to the five members of the Philip Glass Ensemble, plus the solo violin.

== Structure ==
The work is structured as follows:

- Prologue (solo electric organ)
- Knee Play 1 (electric organ, SATB chorus)
- Act 1
  - Scene 1 – Train (piccolo, soprano and tenor saxophones, solo soprano and alto voices, SATB chorus, two electric organs)
  - Scene 2 – Trial
    - Entrance (three flutes, soprano and alto chorus, electric organ)
    - "Mr. Bojangles" (Note: "Mr. Bojangles" refers to the man (Bill Robinson) and the song "Mr. Bojangles") (solo violin, two flutes, bass clarinet, SATB chorus, two electric organs)
    - "Paris"/"All Men Are Equal" (solo electric organ)
- Knee Play 2 (solo violin)
- Act 2
  - Scene 1 – Dance 1 "Field with Spaceship" (piccolo, soprano and alto saxophones, solo soprano and alto voices, two electric organs)
  - Scene 2 – Night Train (solo soprano and tenor voices, two flutes, bass clarinet, SATB chorus, electric organ)
- Knee Play 3 (SATB chorus a cappella)
- Act 3
  - Scene 1 – Trial/Prison
    - "Prematurely Air-Conditioned Supermarket" (SATB chorus, electric organ)
    - Ensemble (three flutes, two electric organs)
    - "I Feel the Earth Move" (soprano saxophone, bass clarinet)
  - Scene 2 – Dance 2 "Field with Spaceship" (solo violin, solo soprano, SATB chorus, electric organ)
- Knee Play 4 (solo violin, tenor and bass chorus)
- Act 4
  - Scene 1 – Building/Train (two electric organs, improvisatory woodwinds and chorus, solo tenor saxophone)
  - Scene 2 – Bed
    - Cadenza (solo electric organ)
    - Prelude (solo electric organ)
    - Aria (solo soprano, electric organ)
  - Scene 3 – Spaceship (flute, tenor saxophone, bass clarinet, solo violin, solo soprano voice, SATB chorus, two electric organs)
- Knee Play 5 (solo violin, soprano and alto chorus, electric organ)

== Recordings ==
Professional ratings
1979 Tomato LP
Review scores
Source	Rating
Christgau's Record Guide	B+
Pitchfork	10/10

Four "complete" recordings of the opera have been made: the first in 1978, initially released on the Tomato label (TOM-4-2901) in 1979, and later reissued by CBS Masterworks, followed by Sony Classical (both M4K 38875); the second in 1993, released that same year on the Nonesuch label (79323). The 1978 recording was held to 165 minutes in order to fit onto four LP records, i.e., the opening scene's repeats were considerably shortened. The 1993 recording encompassed 200 minutes, freed by the technology of the compact disc, although it was released on three CDs instead of the original's four.

Michael Riesman conducted both of the first two recordings. In 1978, Lucinda Childs, Sheryl Sutton, Paul Mann, and Samuel M. Johnson performed the opera's texts, with Philip Glass Ensemble performer Iris Hiskey taking the soprano solo. In 1993 Childs and Sutton repeated their roles, while Gregory Dolbashian and Jasper McGruder replaced Mann and the late Mr. Johnson's roles respectively; Patricia Schuman sang the soprano role. Most of the participants in the Nonesuch recording had performed in Einstein on the Beach during its 1992 world tour.

A third recording was taped live during the 1984 Brooklyn Academy of Music production run. This was released by Philip Glass's personal label Orange Mountain Music in early September 2012, as a 77-minute highlights CD, accompanied by the Changing Image of Opera documentary on DVD. The complete and unedited version, 217 minutes long, was also made available at the same time but only as a download, and later on streaming services.

The fourth, a 270-minute recording from January 2014 at the Théâtre du Châtelet in Paris was released on DVD and Blu-ray in October 2016.

In October 2013, Pacifica Radio released a two disc set of a 1976 interview with Glass and Wilson conducted at The Kitchen and excerpts from a rehearsal of some excerpts from the opera, also performed at The Kitchen on March 19, 1976.

The violin part for the work has been performed by Robert Brown (in the live 1976 production), Paul Zukofsky (in the 1979 recording), Tison Street (in the live 1984 production), Gregory Fulkerson (in the live 1992 production and 1993 recording) and an interchanging performance of Jennifer Koh and Antoine Silverman during the 2012/16 production.

A shortened version of "I Feel the Earth Move", along with three other pieces from the opera, were chosen to appear on the Philip Glass album Songs from the Trilogy.

Anton Batagov recorded 3 transcription pieces (Scene 2 – Trial 1 from act 1, scene 2 – Night Train from act 2 and Knee Play 5) from this work on solo piano in his album Prophecies (2016, on Orange Mountain Music label).

In 2025, ICTUS released a recording with Collegium Vocale Gent and Suzanne Vega on the VLEK label.

== In popular culture ==
The title was used as inspiration for the Counting Crows song "Einstein on the Beach (For an Eggman)" (recorded in 1991), which was later released on the "DGC Rarities Vol. 1" (1994) compilation album.

In the episode "Out with Dad" (2000; S07 E15 PC717) of the TV series Frasier, the title character, an opera lover, says:

"You see, there's a stunning woman who comes to the opera on the same nights we do. She has the box right across from ours. We've flirted a bit from a distance. I have laughed with her during Figaro, cried with her during Tosca. I even had a dream about her during Einstein on the Beach."

Among the works of Peter Schickele's fictitious alter ego P.D.Q. Bach is one called Einstein on the Fritz (S. E=mc^{2}). Schickele was a friend of Philip and was a Juilliard classmate of his.

Helen Pickett's When Love (2012), choreographed for the Dance Theatre of Harlem, used "Knee Play 5" as the music.
