= San Francisco Girls Chorus =

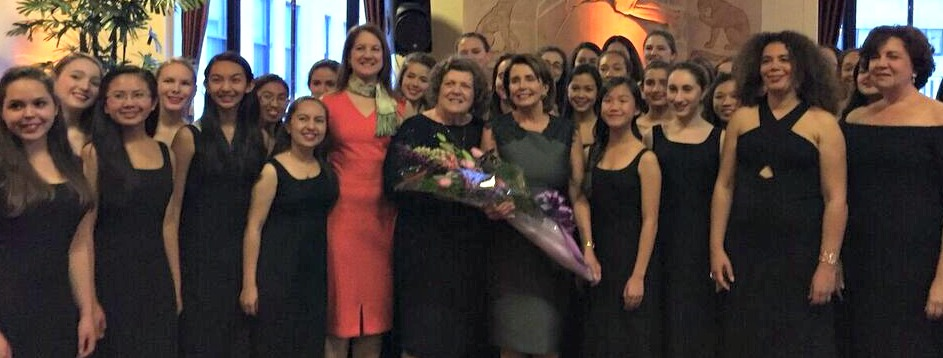
Members of the San Francisco Girls Chorus in 2016

The San Francisco Girls Chorus, established in 1978 by Elizabeth Appling, is a regional center for music education and performance for girls and young women, ages 4–18, based in San Francisco. Each year, more than 300 singers from 45 Bay Area cities participate in SFGC's programs. The organization consists of a professional-level performance, recording, and touring ensemble and a six-level Chorus School training program.

In addition to annual engagements with the San Francisco Opera and San Francisco Symphony, SFGC has engaged in artistic partnerships such as the New York Philharmonic's Biennial Festival of New Music at Lincoln Center in June 2016 in collaboration with The Knights orchestra; SHIFT: A Festival of American Orchestras in April 2017 at the John F. Kennedy Center for the Performing Arts in Washington, DC; and Carnegie Hall in February 2018 with the Philip Glass Ensemble.

The 2018–2019 Season marked SFGC's first year under the leadership of Artistic Director Valérie Sainte-Agathe. (Sainte-Agathe had been appointed Music Director and Principal Conductor in 2013.) Previous Artistic Directors were Elizabeth Appling (1978–1992), Sharon J. Paul (1992–2000), Magen Solomon (2000, interim), Susan McMane (2001–2012), Brandon Brack (2012, interim), and SFGC alumna Lisa Bielawa (2013–2018).

== Premier Ensemble ==
The Premier Ensemble is the concert, recording, and touring ensemble of the San Francisco Girls Chorus, and is conducted by Artistic Director Valérie Sainte-Agathe.

The Premier Ensemble performed at the inauguration of President Barack Obama in January 2009. They sang a total of 20 minutes, as a prelude to the ceremony.

Before the opening of Cuba to U.S. citizens to visit, the Premier Ensemble toured there in July 2011, visiting Havana, Santa Clara, and Matanzas on an international tour.

They sang at the New York Philharmonic's NY Phil Biennial in 2016. They were the only group from outside New York invited to perform there.

In 2017, they sang with The Knights at the SHIFT Festival, at the Kennedy Center.

The SFGC's activities in 2019 included premiering a new work by Fred Frith. In 2020, as the pandemic shut down live performances, the SFGC streamed a virtual festival that included collaborations with the Berkeley Ballet Theater and the Philip Glass Ensemble. Also in 2020, the Chorus won two SFCV Audience Choice Awards and collaborated in an online production of Vivaldi’s Juditha Triumphans. The SFGC was featured on the soundtrack to the Netflix documentary Athlete A, about the abuse of gymnasts by Dr. Larry Nassar.

In 2022 the SFGC performed the choral premiere of Kamala's Hope, a work based on the Vice Presidential acceptance speeches of Kamala Harris, and in June 2023 the SFGC's Premier Ensemble performed the pandemic-delayed debut of the choral-opera Tomorrow’s Memories: A Little Manila Diary, which it had commissioned from composer Matthew Welch, based on the diaries of Filipina immigrant Angeles Monrayo.

Also in 2023, members of the SFGC performed in the world premiere of Prospero's Island, an opera based on Shakespeare's The Tempest, and in the West Coast premiere of the family-friendly opera The Three Feathers.

== The Chorus School ==
SFGC's Chorus School, founded by Elizabeth Avakian, is made up of six levels: non-auditioned Prep Chorus, Training Chorus, and Levels I, II, and Concert Group, which choristers move through as they develop musically. Choristers spend one, two or three years in each level.

Composer-in-Residence: Each season, the Chorus School has a Composer-In-Residence. This composer works with singers throughout the year to create a new composition performed by these singers each spring. This program provides the opportunity for singers to collaborate with working composers, to be immersed in contemporary techniques, and to perform world premieres each season. Composers-in-residence have included: Danny Clay, Lisa Mezzacappa, Angélica Negrón, Pamela Z, Sahba Aminikia, and Gabriela Lena Frank.

Voice Instruction: Working vocal artists are on staff to help guide the vocal development of singers of all levels. Singers in Levels I through IV work toward and perform in a voice recital each spring under the direction of professional voice teachers. Each singer is treated as a soloist as well as a member of an ensemble.

Music Theory Program: Singers in Levels I through IV receive weekly music theory and musicianship training. Music literacy is a core component of the SFGC curriculum and each Level has prescribed literacy goals. When singers graduate from the Chorus School, they are required to pass an examination that leaves them prepared for AP Music Theory.

Special Projects: Chorus School singers often participate in special projects, including operas, symphonies, and recording sessions, with Bay Area artistic partners. These special projects aim to help musicians develop stage presence, flexibility, and acting skills. In the past, singers have performed with the San Francisco Opera, Opera Parallèle, the Berkeley Symphony, the San Francisco Conservatory, Ninth Planet Productions, Solo Opera, San Francisco Ballet, and others.

== Recordings ==
The Premier Ensemble has recorded and released nine solo CD recordings including: Voices of Hope and Peace, which includes "Anne Frank: A Living Voice" by American composer Linda Tutas Haugen; Christmas, a selection of diverse holiday songs; Crossroads, a collection of world folk music; Music From the Venetian Ospedali, a disc of Italian Baroque music, for which The New Yorker proclaimed the Chorus "tremendously accomplished;" and their first double-disc release, Heaven and Earth, using recordings from 2008–09. The Premier Ensemble's February 2018 solo CD recording, Final Answer, was released on Philip Glass's Orange Mountain Music label and features works by composers Philip Glass, Lisa Bielawa, Gabriel Kahane, John Zorn, Carla Kihlstedt, Aleksandra Vrebalov, Sahba Aminikia, Matthew Welch and Theo Bleckmann.

Their most recent album, My Outstretched Hand, released in 2019 by Supertrain Records, features the world premiere of Colin Jacobsen's three-movement (although only two appear on the album) piece If I Were Not Me as well as Lisa Bielawa's My Outstretched Hand, previously performed at the Kennedy Center, and the two-movement Remembering the Sea by Aaron Jay Kernis. Also in 2019 they appeared on the recording of Vireo: The Spiritual Biography of a Witch's Accuser, an opera by Lisa Bielawa.

The Premier Ensemble can also be heard on several recordings with the San Francisco Symphony, including five GRAMMY award-winning CDs. These are Orff: Carmina Burana (1992); Stravinsky: The Firebird, The Rite of Spring, Persephone (1999); Mahler: Symphony No. 8 (2008); and Mahler: Symphony No. 3 and Kindertotenlieder (2004). The Premier Ensemble has appeared in two feature films and one Netflix documentary, The Talented Mr. Ripley (2000), What Dreams May Come (1998), and Athlete A (2020).

== Commissions ==
The Chorus encourages creation of new music for treble voices by partnering with composers to commission and premiere new works. Richard Danielpour, Aaron Jay Kernis, Gabriela Lena Frank, Philip Glass, Augusta Read Thomas, Libby Larsen, Jake Heggie, Chen Yi, and other composers have created and arranged works specifically for the Chorus.

== Kanbar Center ==
The Kanbar Performing Arts Center, opened in 2005, at 44 Page Street in San Francisco, is the home of the San Francisco Girls Chorus.

== Summer Music Camp ==
Each summer, SFGC holds a week-long chorus camp for choristers in its Levels II, III, IV ensembles and the Premier Ensemble at the Rio Lindo Adventist Academy in Healdsburg, California. During this camp, the young women prepare their music for the regular season and have classes in music theory, sightsinging, and dance. They also participate in fun activities such as the Counselor Hunt, Big Sister/Little Sister Night and the Square Dance.

== Discography ==
- My Outstretched Hand (2019)
- Vireo: The Spiritual Biography of a Witch's Accuser (2019)
- Final Answer (2018)
- Heaven and Earth (2009)
- Voices of Hope and Peace (2006)
- Christmas (2003)
- Crossroads (2000)
- Music from the Venetian Ospedali (1998)
- I Never Saw Another Butterfly; Songs of the Twentieth Century (1996)
- A San Francisco Christmas (1996)
