= Ann Cleare =

Irish composer

Ann Cleare (born 1983 in County Offaly) is an Irish composer. She is assistant professor at Trinity College Dublin. In 2019 she won the Ernst von Siemens Composers' Prize, sharing it with Annesley Black and Mithatcan Öcal.

== Education ==
Cleare studied with John Godfrey and Jesse Ronneau at University College Cork, where she was awarded an MPhil. She later studied at IRCAM in Paris and went on to complete her PhD in composition with Chaya Czernowin and Hans Tutschku at Harvard University. She has been an Associate Lecturer in Composition at the University of York.

== On magnetic fields ==
Her 2011–2012 work, on magnetic fields, was commissioned by the Wittener Tage für neue Kammermusik and premiered by the Collegium Novum Zürich. This work, which separates the performers into three chamber ensembles, uses two violin soloists as a kind of sculpted "electric current" to propel the interaction between the musicians.

She later created a version of the piece for two violins and loudspeaker which was premiered by the Riot Ensemble in London on 14 May 2018. In an interview with Tim Rutherford-Johnson, Cleare described the work:

At the centre of two of the spatially divided chamber groups lies a solo violin. I think of both solo violins as "electric currents", wiry voices that magnetically charge the electricity of the ensemble that surrounds them, wrapping layers of various sonic materials around the violins, providing what I think of as an electric cloud for the evolving violin electricities to speak from.

== Eöl ==
In 2015, MATA Festival commissioned Cleare to write a piece for the Talea Ensemble, and she wrote Eöl for a collection of small percussion instruments surrounded by a small ensemble. The percussion instruments are all made with different metals in order to make use of their varied timbral characteristics. In an interview, Cleare said,

In a geological sense, the word "eolian" signifies something borne, deposited, produced or eroded by the wind. This particularly connects to the porous role that the accordion plays in the piece. It is like a medium that the other instruments of the ensemble transform and interact through. And in a mythical sense, the title alludes to Eöl, an elf from J. R. R. Tolkien's Middle Earth writings, who skillfully wove metals into various magical armors. The ensemble enacts a similar type of sonic weaving, leading to the formation of the percussionist's metallic hands.

== Portrait concert ==
On 1 March 2018, the International Contemporary Ensemble presented a portrait concert of Cleare's work at Miller Theater, including her works teeth of light, tongue of waves (a world premiere and a co-commission by the ensemble and the theatre), to another of that other, the square of yellow light that is your window and Dorchadas.

== Awards ==
- 2006: College Scholar from University College Cork for achievement and excellence in academic studies
- 2010: Shortlisted for the Gaudeamus Prize, Holland
- 2012: Derek C. Bok Excellence in Teaching Award, Harvard University
- 2012: Named one of NPR's top composers under 40, WQXR, New York
- June 2013: Staubach Honorarium recipient from IMD (Darmstadt Music Courses), Germany
- February 2019: Ernst von Siemens Composer Prize
- October 2019: Honorary Doctorate from the National University of Ireland

=== Solo portrait concerts ===
- March 2018: Miller Theatre, Columbia University, with The International Contemporary Ensemble
- October 2019: Musikfabrik, Cologne
- November 2019: Riot Ensemble, Huddersfield Contemporary Music Festival, UK; broadcast on BBC Radio 3

=== Outstanding commissions and performances ===
- April 2015: Recipient of MATA Commission for 2015 Festival, one of three composers chosen from over 950 applications
- April 2020: International Society for Contemporary Music – work selected from International Call for New Zealand Festival 2020

== Selected works ==
=== Orchestra ===
- eyam v (woven) for contrabass flute, contrabass clarinet, and orchestra (2015–17)
- phôsphors (...of ether) for orchestra (2012/13)
- to another of that other for trumpet, trombone, clarinet and orchestra (2009/13)
- Claustrophobia – Four Movements for String Orchestra (2005–2006)

=== Opera ===
- One Here Now: A Sonic Theatre for voices, percussion, and electronics (2017/18)
- rinn, a chamber opera for two actors, three singers, large ensemble, and electronic sculpture/staging (2014–16)

=== Chamber music ===
- teeth of light, tongue of waves for soprano and bassoon with bowed guitar, viola, cello, and double bass (2017/18)
- fiáin for violin, viola, cello, electric guitar, and electric bass guitar (2017)
- 93 million miles away for violin, cello, and piano (2016)
- eyam ii (taking apart your universe) for contrabass clarinet solo and ensemble (2009–2016)
- ore for one high reed wind instrument (clarinet/oboe/saxophone) and string trio (2016)
- eöl for percussion solo with clarinet, saxophone, accordion, cello and double bass (2014/15)
- luna|lithe|lair for bfl, bcl, ca, asax, pno, perc, vln, vla, vc (2013/14)
- I should live in wires for leaving you behind for 2 pianists (1 piano) and 2 percussionists (2014)
- anchor me to the land for small ensemble (2014)
- the square of yellow light that is your window for a.sax (solo), perc, pf, e.gt (2013/14)
- eyam iii (if it’s living somewhere outside of you) for solo bass flute shadowed by one low wind instrument and one string instrument (2013/15)
- mire|…|veins for brass quintet (2013)
- to another of that other for trumpet, trombone, clarinet (2009–13)
- on magnetic fields for two violins and one loudspeaker (2011–2012)
- on magnetic fields for ensemble (2011–2012)
- of violet ether for ensemble (2011)
- moil for string quartet (2010)
- unable to create an offscreen world (c) for picc, perc, bcl, vln, vc (2010)
- unable to create an offscreen world (b) for piccolo and percussion (2010)
- Inner for cello/viola/violin and piano (2009)
- To Exist, Press the Green Button for picc/afl, cl, bcl, b.tbn, cymbal, vc, db (2009)
- Dysmorphia for viola and cello (2008)
- The Apophenia Transmissions for wind quintet (2008)
- Dorchadas for bfl, bcl, bsn, tbn, perc, pf, vla, vc, db (2007)
- Aspira for large wind and brass ensemble (2007)
- Day Two for violin, cello, piano (2006)

=== Solo instrumental ===
- where cobalt waves live for solo piano (2017)
- luna (the eye that opens the other eye) for alto saxophone solo (2013/14)
- eyam iii (if it’s living somewhere outside of you) for solo bass flute (2013)
- eyam i (it takes an ocean not to) for B♭ clarinet solo (2009–13)
- IRK for viola/violin with optional electronics (2006)
