= Christina Courtin =

American musician

- Birth name: Christina Courtin
- Born: 1984 (age 40–41) Buffalo, New York
- Genres: Acoustic, folk, soul, jazz, classical
- Occupation(s): Musician, songwriter, composer
- Instrument(s): Violin, Voice
- Years active: 2005–present
- Labels: Nonesuch, In A Circle Records
- Website: Official website

Christina Courtin (born 1984) is an American singer, violinist, songwriter and composer.

A performer from an early age and a graduate of the Juilliard School, Christina Courtin released her first, self-titled, album in June 2009 on Nonesuch Records, of which Patrick McKiernan of website allgigs.co.uk stated, "It's nothing short of immense how beautiful this girl's debut album is." She was featured on NPR's World Cafe in 2009. She performs regularly with The Knights, an ensemble founded by fellow Juilliard graduates, brothers Colin and Eric Jacobsen.
