= Anna Schuleit Haber =

German-American artist

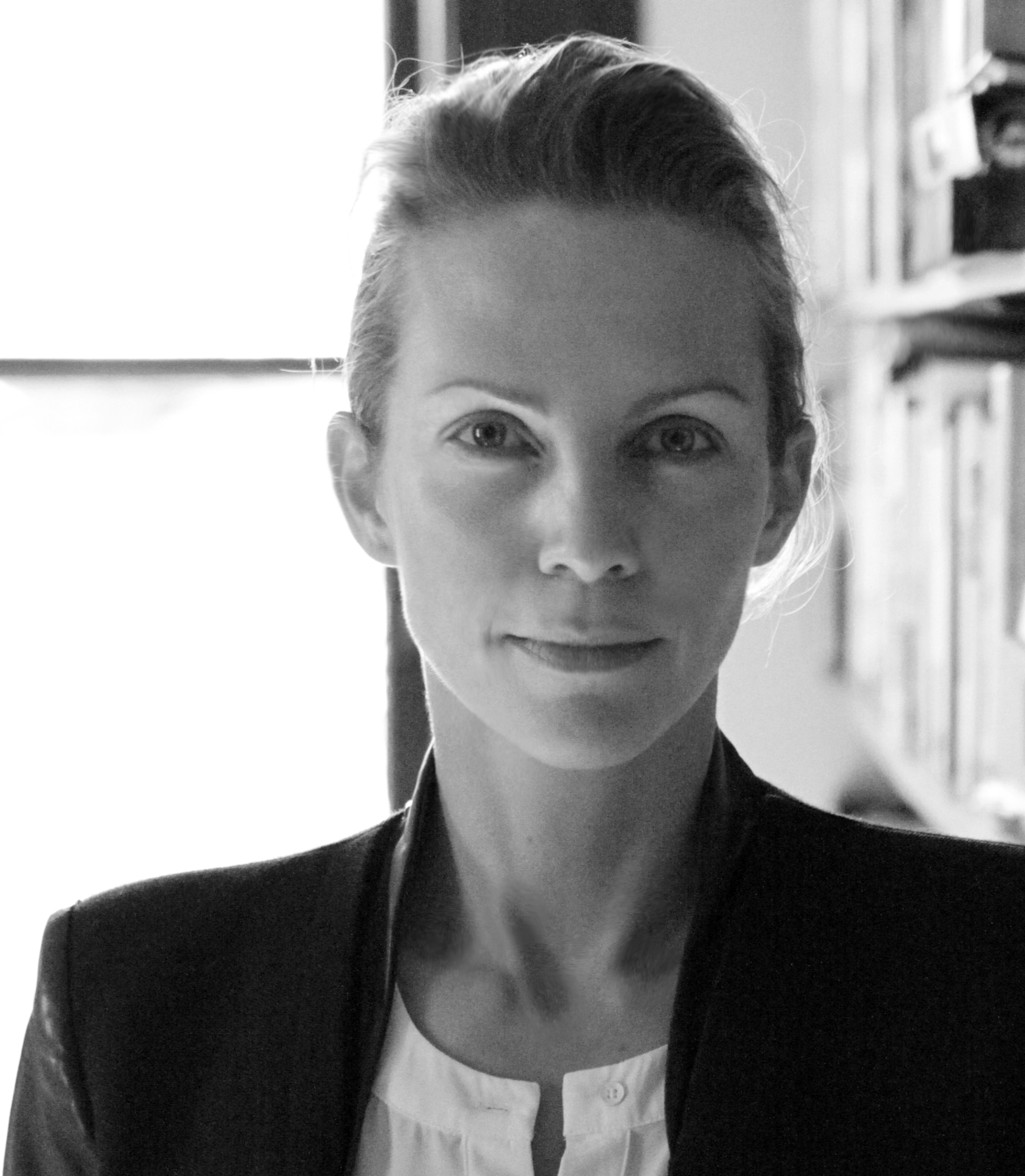
- Schuleit Haber in 2019
- Born: Anna Schuleit; 1974 (age 51–52); Mainz, Germany
- Occupation: Artist
- Years active: 1998–present
- Notable work: "Habeas Corpus" (2000) "Bloom" (2003) "Landlines" (2007) "Just a Rumor" (2010-11) "The Alphabet" (2015) "One Silver, One Gold" (2018) "The Voice Imitator" (2018) "Ser Du Mig?" (2020) "The Magic Years" (2020-22) "Who Cares" (2024)
- Movement: Contemporary
- Awards: MacArthur Fellow; Radcliffe Fellow
- Website: anna-haber.com

Anna Schuleit Haber (born 1974) is a German-American visual artist. Throughout her career, Schuleit Haber's work has focused on marginalized communities.

== Biography ==
Anna Schuleit Haber attended high school at Northfield Mount Hermon School before studying painting and art history at the Rhode Island School of Design where she received her B.F.A. in 1998, and her M.A. in creative writing / book arts at Dartmouth College in 2005. In 2013, Schuleit Haber married composer Yotam Haber.

== Work ==
Trained as a painter, Schuleit Haber's works range from museum installations made with paint, to large-scale projects in forests, on uninhabited islands, and in psychiatric institutions, using extensive sound systems, live sod, thousands of flowers, mirrors, antique telephones, bodies of water, and neuroscience technologies. Her work has been featured in exhibitions at the Institute of Contemporary Art (ICA) Boston, the Museum of Fine Arts Boston; the University Museum of Contemporary Art; Bowdoin College, Brunswick, Maine; the Brattleboro Museum; The Matzo Files, NYC; the Mousonturm, Frankfurt, Germany; and the Carpenter Center for the Visual Arts at Harvard University, among others. Her works are included in private collections throughout the U.S., Europe, Asia, and Australia, as well as in the Stedelijk Museum Amsterdam, and the Vehbi Koç Foundation at ARTER, Istanbul, Turkey.

She has been a fellow at the Radcliffe Institute for Advanced Study, the RISD European Honors Program in Rome, the MacDowell Colony, Yaddo, Blue Mountain Center, the Banff Centre, and the Bogliasco Foundation in Italy. In 2006, Schuleit Haber was named a MacArthur Fellow for work that has "conceptual clarity, compassion, and beauty". "Just a Rumor" was commissioned by the University Museum of Contemporary Art in Amherst, 2010–11, a large, outdoor work in which wild ducks became the artist's collaborators. It consisted of a mostly abstract, three-story-high, upside-down, painted portrait of a male face. When the portrait's reflection was viewed on the surface of the adjacent campus pond, the image was inverted, producing a double-portrait: the upside-down original and the right-side-up reflection of it. The painting measured 30 ft × 40 ft (9.1 m × 12.2 m), created in acrylic paint. The effects of the reflected face in the water were changing constantly throughout the day and into the night, inviting viewers to re-visit the site at different times. The pond was also home to wild ducks that acted as unwitting collaborators in the piece: as they criss-crossed the reflected painting, spontaneous moments of abstraction were created, making the face disappear from the water's surface, and then re-appear at random. The painting and its reflection in the water were not marked, there was no explanatory signage to follow, rather, they had to be discovered and pieced together by the viewer.

Schuleit Haber then served as visiting artist at the Eastman School of Music in Rochester, New York, working on a call-and-response collaborative piece with graduate students in composition Rachel Seah, Anthony Duarte, Stylianos Dimou, and Jason Thorpe Buchanan. In 2013, she began "The Voice Imitator" project, for which she was awarded a NYFA grant. The project encompasses a series of 104 abstract works inspired by short stories by the Austrian writer Thomas Bernhard. Works from this series were on view at Art Central Hong Kong and at the Saatchi Gallery, London. Other recent exhibitions include two-person and solo-shows in New York City, as well as set designs created in collaboration with dancers at the Chocolate Factory Theater, and at New York Live Arts in NYC.

As part of a 2015 museum commission and a National Endowment for the Arts grant, Schuleit Haber embedded herself in a small-town newsroom where she staged a serial 'take-over' of twenty-six front pages in collaboration with typographers from around the world, poets, writers, journalists, local citizens, and students. The contributing typographers included Matthew Carter, Cyrus Highsmith, Nicholas Benson, Ahrens and Mugikura, Catherine Griffiths, Esen Karol, Indra Kupferschmidt, Akira Kobayashi, among many others. The project had written contributions by Neil Gaiman, Kurt Vonnegut, Jeff Sharlet, Peter Gizzi, George Saunders and Adrian Nicole LeBlanc. Studio 360's Kurt Andersen reviewed the project and described it as "brilliant". The print edition reached 15,000, and the project received two New England Newspaper & Press Association awards. "If newspapers are about literacy, then this series is the ultimate." the judges wrote.

In 2019–20, she worked on "Ser Du Mig", a collaboration on the theme of urban poverty with the Danish group 'CoreAct' led by performance artists Anika Barkan and Helene Kvint, and playwright Abelone Koppel, which premiered at Teater Grob, Copenhagen, during the pandemic. Other works appeared in Agni, Virginia Quarterly Review, The Believer, The Massachusetts Review, and in the journal of the Cleveland Urban Design Center. From 2020 through 2022, Schuleit Haber created a commissioned work, "The Magic Years", for a private collection in Winter Park, Florida, inspired by the writings of the child psychoanalyst Selma Fraiberg. Schuleit Haber's current works include a multi-year, collaborative project about grief and forests for which she was awarded a 2023 Summer fellowship at the Harvard Radcliffe Institute.
