= Sahba Aminikia =

Iranian-born American composer and artistic director

Sahba Aminikia صهبا امینی کیا
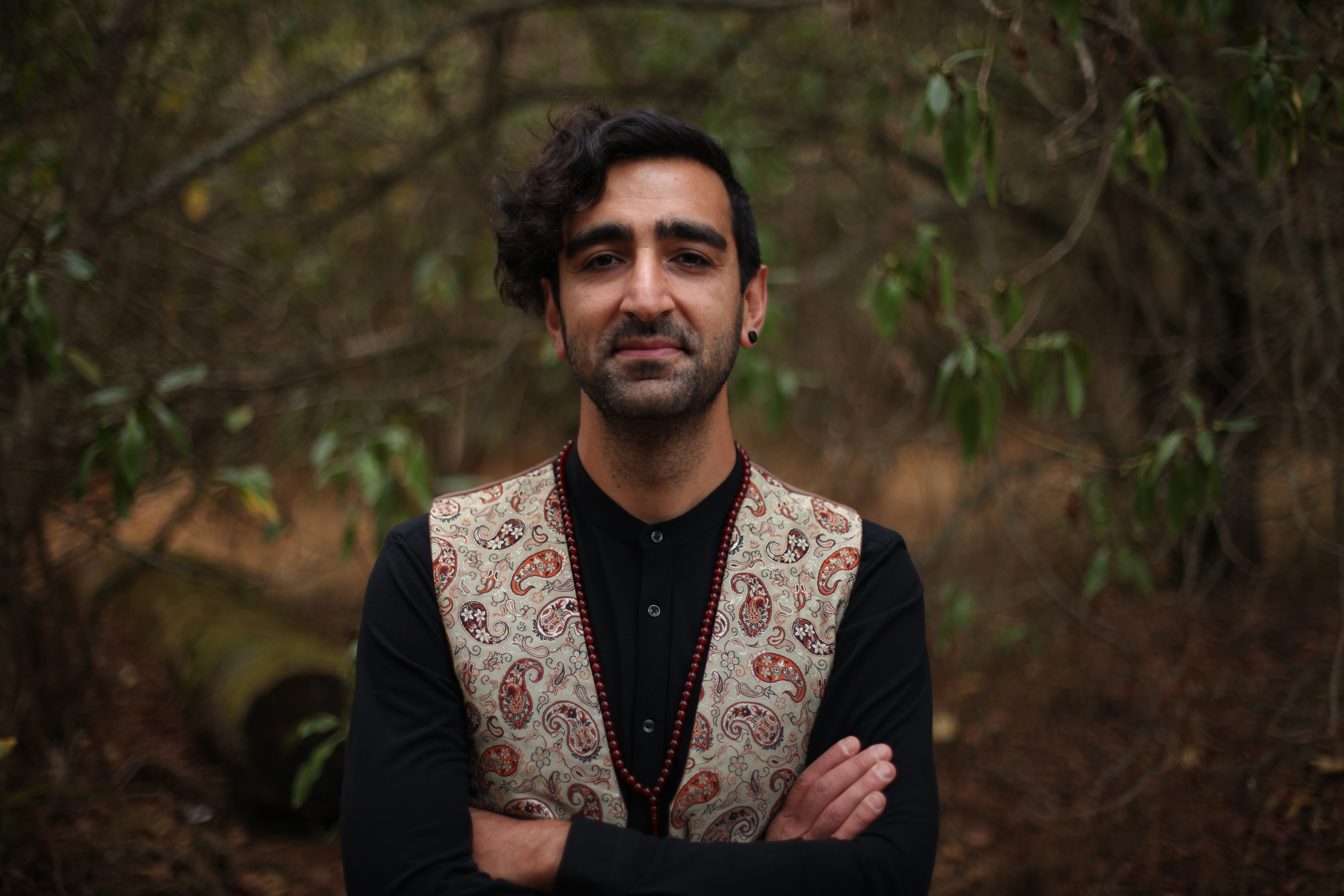
- Sahba Aminikia in 2020

Background information
- Born: August 27, 1981 (age 45); Tehran, Iran
- Occupations: Composer, Artistic Director, performer, educator
- Years active: 2000–present
- Website: www.sahbakia.com

Sahba Aminikia (born August 27, 1981) is an Iranian-born American contemporary music composer, artistic director, performer, educator and a TED Fellow. Aminikia is the founder and the artistic director of Flying Carpet Festival, the first performing arts festival for children living in war zones.

His musical compositions have been widely performed around the world by contemporary classical ensembles orchestras, and bands, including the Kronos Quartet, Brooklyn Youth Chorus, San Francisco Girls Chorus, Mahsa Vahdat, Marjan Vahdat, Shahram Nazeri, International Contemporary Ensemble, Verdigris Ensemble, Carnegie Hall Ensemble Connect, Minnesota Philharmonic Orchestra, Akron Symphony Orchestra, Symphony Parnassus, Ensemble Elefant, ZOFO Duet, San Francisco Conservatory of Music New Music Ensemble, Mobius Trio, Delphi Trio, Amaranth Quartet, The Living Earth Show, Verdigris Ensemble, Music of Remembrance, One Found Sound, and Afghanistan National Institute of Music.

== Early years ==
Sahba Aminikia was born in 1981 in Tehran, Iran; during the Iran-Iraq War. Raised during a religious theocracy, in a poetic yet chaotic society, he had been exposed to the influences of poets such as Hafiz, Rumi, Forough Farrokhzad and Ahmad Shamlu, as well as traditional, classical and jazz music and the music of Shostakovich, Reza Vali, Stravinsky, Philip Glass, Osvaldo Golijov, Aziza Mustafazadeh, Pink Floyd, The Beatles, and Queen during his upbringing.

As a member of the Baháʼí community, Aminikia faced systemic discrimination, including being barred from higher education in Iran. In 2011, while visiting Iran as a permanent resident of the United States, Aminikia was arrested and subjected to torture by Iranian security forces. He has cited this harrowing experience as a fundamental turning point in his creative life, shifting his artistic perspective toward the plight of marginalized and oppressed communities globally.

== Education ==
Sahba Aminikia has been trained in musical composition under Iranian pianists Nikan Milani, Safa Shahidi, Gagik Babayan, and perhaps most influenced by work with his first composition teacher, Mehran Rouhani, a graduate of Royal Academy of Music and a former student of Sir Michael Tippett. He later relocated to St. Petersburg, Russia where he studied music composition at the Saint Petersburg Conservatory under Boris Tishchenko, a life-time student of Dmitri Shostakovich.

He received his Bachelor of Music and Master of Music with honors at San Francisco Conservatory of Music, where he studied with David Garner, David Conte, Daniel J. Becker, and Conrad Susa. He also received lessons from Richard Danielpour, Osvaldo Golijov, John Corigliano, and John Adams.

== Work ==
Sahba Aminkia's compositions have been widely performed in United States, Canada, Iran, United Arab Emirates, Brazil, Ecuador, France, Italy, Poland, China, Greece, Turkey and Israel and at venues such as Carnegie Hall, Kennedy Center for the Performing Arts, Le Poisson Rouge, Yerba Buena Center for the Arts, SF Exploratorium, SFJAZZ Center and St. Ann's Warehouse.

Aminikia has collaborated extensively with prominent Iranian vocalists to bridge traditional Persian music with contemporary classical forms. He has worked closely with sisters Mahsa Vahdat and Marjan Vahdat, and legendary Persian classical singer Shahram Nazeri, creating contemporary arrangements of traditional repertoire for Western chamber ensembles.

His third string quartet, "A Threnody for Those Who Remain", was described by Financial Times as “An experience not to be easily forgotten.” His work Tar o Pood (Warp and Weft) was the second-place recipient of the 2015 American Prize in composition.

As part of a Virtual reality experience, he wrote the music for "Sea Prayer" by The Guardian based on a story by Khaled Hosseini, performed by Kronos Quartet. Aminikia was the artist-in-residence at Kronos Festival 2017. His collaboration with the San Francisco Girls Chorus and Afghanistan National Institute of Music resulted in "Music of Spheres," published in 2018 by Orange Mountain Music.

=== Flying Carpet Festival ===
Aminikia is the founder and artistic director for Flying Carpet Festival, a mobile music festival serving children in conflict zones. He serves as the musical director for Sirkhane, a non-profit in Mardin, Turkey, which has served approximately 400,000 children through circus arts and music. By 2025, the festival had facilitated over 540 workshops and 193 artist residencies.

== Recent works ==
- SHAMS (2023): A choral work inspired by Rumi commissioned by the Verdigris Ensemble.
- The Language of the Birds (2023): A multimedia piece created during a residency at the 836M Gallery.
- Woman, Life, Freedom (2024): A protest anthem commissioned by the San Francisco Girls Chorus, based on poetry by Hafez and dedicated to the Iranian women's movement.
- Four Seasons (2023): Composed for the Kronos Quartet's 50th Anniversary, this work is a threnody for the ecological crisis at Lake Urmia.

== Awards and honors ==
- 2025: Aga Khan Music Awards — Laureate, recognized for "visionary creativity" in guiding the Flying Carpet Festival.
- 2024: TED Fellow — Delivered the talk "The greatest show on Earth — for kids who need it most."
- 2017: Artist-in-residence at Kronos Festival 2017: Here and Now
- 2015: American Prize - Professional Chamber Music Division - 2nd Place
- 2014: Stone Fellow Composer, Great Lakes Chamber Music Festival, Bloomfield, Michigan
- 2012: Winner of Shanghai-San Francisco International Chamber Music Festival Composition Competition.
- 2010: Phyllis Wattis Foundation Scholarship
- 2010: ASCAP Morton Gould Young Composer Awards Finalist
