= MATA Festival =

Music Festival in New York City

- Status: Active
- Genre: Music festival
- Frequency: Annually
- Inaugurated: 1996
- Website: matafestival.org

The MATA Festival is a New York–based annual contemporary classical music festival devoted to championing the works of young composers. It was founded in 1996 by Philip Glass, Lisa Bielawa and Eleonor Sandresky and is currently under the leadership of executive director Pauline Kim Harris.

== History ==
Bielawa and Sandresky were part of Glass's touring ensemble in the early 1990s; during road tours, the three conceived of concerts that would serve as an outlet for unaffiliated composers. These concerts would later form the basis of the MATA festival. MATA's concerts were originally presented at the Anthology Film Archives, leading to its name: the acronym stands for "Music at the Anthology". Since then, the festival has been presented at various venues, such as Le Poisson Rouge, Roulette, and The Kitchen.

Past directors and employees of MATA include Yotam Haber. David T. Little, Missy Mazzoli, James Matheson, Christopher McIntyre, Todd Tarantino, Alex Weiser, Loren Loiacono, and founders Glass, Bielawa and Sandresky.

== Commissioned composers ==
- 2023 festival: Golnaz Shariatzadeh, Shara Lunon, Jane Boxall
- 2021–2022 festival: Elijah J. Thomas, Meaghan Burke, George Tsz-Kwan Lam, Flannery Cunningham
- 2018 festival: Daniel Silliman, Erin Rogers, Jenna Lyle, Annie Gosfield, Jennifer Higdon, David T. Little, Nico Muhly, and Ken Ueno
- 2017 festival: Eric Wubbels, Kristina Wolfe, Siraseth Pantura-umporn
- 2016 festival: Weijun Chen, Helen Papaioannou, Matthew Welch, Yair Klartag
- 2015 festival: Ann Cleare, Adam de la Cour, Wang Lu
- 2014 festival: Hikari Kiyama, Edward Hamel, Carolyn Chen
- 2013 festival: Evan Antonellis, Bryan Jacobs, Jobina Tinnemans
- 2012 festival: Francesco Filidei, Qin Yi, Huck Hodge
- 2011 festival: Ryan Carter, Christopher Mayo, Angélica Negrón
- Interval 4.1 (2010): Timo Andres, Brett Banducci, Yotam Haber, Joseph Hallman, Ted Hearne, Andrew Norman, Paola Prestini, Chris Thile, Shara Worden
- 2010 festival: Julian Day, Matthew Wright
- 2009 festival: Andrew Hamilton, Nicole Lizee, Mike Vernusky
- 2008 festival: Sean Griffin, Žibuoklė Martinaitytė, Micah Silver
- 2007 festival: Yotam Haber, K-Kalna, Ned McGowan, Christopher Tignor
- Monster Composer Rally II (2005): Brian Heller, K-Kalna, Doug Opel, Charles Waters
- Monster Composer Rally I (2005): Randall Bauer, Alex Mincek, Vache Sharafyan

== Critical acclaim ==
MATA is consistently praised as one of the leading contemporary classical music festivals, and has been called "the city's leading showcase for vital new music by emerging composers” by the New Yorker, "the contemporary classical equivalent of the U.N. General Assembly” by the Village Voice and "inventive, stylistically nondogmatic" by the New York Times.
