= Jon Gibson (minimalist musician) =

American minimalist musician (1940–2020)

- Born: March 11, 1940; Los Angeles, California, U.S.
- Died: October 11, 2020 (aged 80); Springfield, Massachusetts, U.S.
- Education: Sacramento State University; San Francisco State University
- Occupations: Flutist; Saxophonist; Composer; Visual artist
- Organizations: Philip Glass Ensemble

Jon Gibson (March 11, 1940 – October 11, 2020) was an American flutist, saxophonist, composer and visual artist, known as one of the founding members of the Philip Glass Ensemble. He was a key player on several seminal minimalist music compositions. He was born in Los Angeles to Charles and Muriel (née Taylor) Gibson, both educators, and grew up in El Monte, a suburb.

== Education ==
Gibson studied at Sacramento State University and later at San Francisco State University with Henry Onderdonk and Wayne Peterson, where he earned a BA in 1964. His earliest work as an improviser and composer also dates from around this time, when he performed in the New Music Ensemble with composers Larry Austin, Richard Swift, and Stanley Lunetta.

== Career ==
Gibson used various instruments from around the world in his performances of jazz and classical music. He was a founding member of the Philip Glass Ensemble, and his mastery of circular breathing techniques made him crucial to the development of Glass' sound. Glass stated, "To put it bluntly, the music wouldn’t have happened without that.” Gibson performed in the premieres of In C by Terry Riley and Drumming by Steve Reich, as well as Reich's 1967 composition Reed Phase, which Reich wrote especially for him. For a time in the 1960s, alongside Philip Glass & Steve Reich, Gibson performed the music of Moondog during weekly sessions with the composer, recordings of which were made by Reich. He was briefly a member of the Theatre of Eternal Music with La Monte Young, and in the 1970s Gibson studied with Pandit Pran Nath.

He also performed and recorded with other composers, some of them minimalists, as well as composing for choreographers, including Christian Wolff, David Behrman, Harold Budd, Alvin Curran, Arthur Russell, Annea Lockwood, Robert Ashley, Lucinda Childs, Robert Wilson and Frederic Rzewski.

In 1973, Gibson's debut solo recording Visitations was released on the Chatham Square label, run by Philip Glass. Visitations is a departure from the structured repetitions of his minimalist contemporaries, instead using field recordings, ambient flutes, synthesizers and free-flowing percussive textures. In 1977, Two Solo Pieces was also released on the Chatham Square imprint, consisting of the droning organ composition Cycles and Untitled, a piece for solo alto flute.

Gibson was also an accomplished visual artist. Throughout his career, he created numerous graphic text based works laden with musical information. He also created the cover artwork for albums such as Two Solo Pieces and Criss X Cross. In 2017, Gibson performed at Moogfest.

Gibson died on October 11, 2020, from complications of a brain tumor.

== Discography ==
- Visitations (1973) (Chatham Square)
- Two Solo Pieces (1977) (Chatham Square)
- In Good Company (1992) (Point Music)
- Criss X Cross (2006) (Tzadik Records)
- The Dance (2013) (Orange Mountain Music)
- Relative Calm (2016) (New World Records)
- Violet Fire: An Opera About Nikola Tesla (2019) (Orange Mountain Music)
- Songs & Melodies: 1973-1977 (2020) (Superior Viaduct)
