= Helga Davis =

American multidisciplinary artist

Helga Davis is a New York-based multidisciplinary artist who works as an actress, singer, writer and composer, as well as a radio and podcast host.

== Performances ==
Helga Davis performed as a principal actor in the 25th-anniversary international revival of Robert Wilson and Philip Glass's opera Einstein on the Beach. The New York Times described Davis' performance as "Compelling." Robert Wilson described Davis as "a united whole, with spellbinding inner power and strength." David Keenan, of The Wire magazine, described Davis as "a powerful vocalist with an almost operatic range and all the bruised sensuality of Jeanne Lee."

Davis' music career has included a stint in the rock band Women in Love, in the 1990s. More recently, Davis has starred in operas and theater pieces internationally, including Robert Wilson's The Temptation of St. Anthony, libretto and score by Bernice Johnson Reagon; her and Toshi Reagon's Octavia E. Butler's Parable Of The Sower, Milton by Katie Pearl and Lisa Damour; The Blue Planet, a multimedia theater piece, by Peter Greenaway and Saskia Boddeke; and Soho Rep's Jomama Jones, Radiate, which was included in The New Yorker theatre critic Hilton Als’s top ten list. Among the many works that have been written for Davis are Faust's Box, written and directed by Italian contemporary music composer Andrea Liberovici; Oceanic Verses by Paola Prestini, with libretto by Donna DiNovelli; and Elsewhere by Missy Mazzoli and Maya Beiser.

Davis hosts the "Helga" podcast, live events for New Sounds and WQXR-FM's Q2 Music.

== Awards and appointments ==
Davis is the recipient of the BRIC Fireworks grant and the ASCAP Multimedia Award, as well as the 2019 Greenfield Prize. Davis was appointed the Visiting Curator for the Performing Arts at the Isabella Stewart Gardner Museum, in Boston, for 2018-2021.

== Early life and education ==
Davis was born and raised in Harlem, in New York City. She performed in high school theater productions, studied piano and sang in a church choir.
