= The Hours (soundtrack) =

Soundtrack album by Philip Glass
- Released: 2002
- Genre: Soundtrack
- Label: Elektra/Nonesuch

Philip Glass chronology
| The Baroness and the Pig (2002) | The Hours (2002) | The Fog of War (2003) |

The Hours is the original soundtrack album, on the Elektra/Nonesuch label, of the 2002 film The Hours, starring Nicole Kidman, Meryl Streep and Julianne Moore.

The original score was composed by Philip Glass. The music was performed by Michael Riesman (piano), the Lyric Quartet (Edmund Coxon and Rolf Wilson, violins; Nick Barr, viola; and David Daniels, cello), Chris Laurence (double bass), and an orchestra conducted by Nick Ingman.

Not all of the music in the film was composed specifically for it: earlier music by Glass, including the "Protest" theme from his opera Satyagraha, and the Franz Kafka inspired "Metamorphosis Two" from his album Solo Piano, was also featured and credited separately at the end of the film.

The album won the BAFTA Award for Best Film Music. It was also nominated for the Academy Award for Best Original Score, the Golden Globe Award for Best Original Score and the Grammy Award for Best Score Soundtrack Album for a Motion Picture, Television or Other Visual Media (lost to the score of the film The Lord of the Rings: The Two Towers).

Michael Riesman and Nico Muhly arranged the soundtrack for piano solo. Riesman’s recording of this was released on Orange Mountain Music in 2004. This score was published in 2003 as a 64-paged book containing most of the tracks (excluding "For Your Own Benefit", "Vanessa and the Changelings" and "The Kiss").

In 2012, Dutch harpist Lavinia Meijer released 6 tracks from the film on her album of Philip Glass approved transcriptions, Metamorphosis / The Hours.

== Track listing ==
| No. | Song title | Time |
|---|---|---|
| 1. | The Poet Acts | 03:40 |
| 2. | Morning Passages | 05:30 |
| 3. | Something She Has to Do | 03:09 |
| 4. | "For Your Own Benefit" | 02:00 |
| 5. | Vanessa and the Changelings | 01:45 |
| 6. | "I'm Going to Make a Cake" | 04:01 |
| 7. | An Unwelcome Friend | 04:08 |
| 8. | Dead Things | 04:21 |
| 9. | The Kiss | 03:54 |
| 10. | "Why Does Someone Have to Die?" | 03:53 |
| 11. | Tearing Herself Away | 05:00 |
| 12. | Escape! | 03:48 |
| 13. | Choosing Life | 03:50 |
| 14. | The Hours | 07:44 |
| | Total time | 56:43 |
