= Yotam Haber =

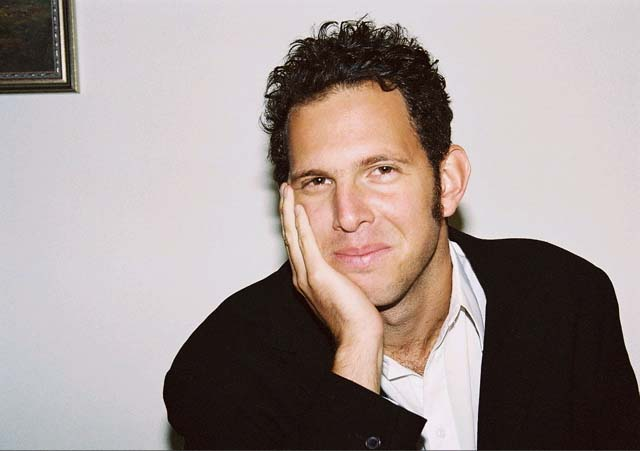
Portrait of Yotam Haber, Photo: Ada Haber, circa 1998. Used with permission.

Yotam Haber (Hebrew: יותם הבר)(born October 27, 1976) is a composer based in Boston. He is a 2005 Guggenheim fellow, a 2007 Rome Prize winner in Music Composition., and was named a 2023-2024 Fulbright Distinguished Senior Scholar, teaching and researching at the Jerusalem Academy of Music and Dance. He is currently Associate Professor of Music Composition at Boston University and serves as Director of the BU Center for New Music.

== Biography ==
Yotam Haber was born October 27, 1976 in the Netherlands and grew up in Israel, Nigeria, and Milwaukee. He studied music composition at Indiana University with Eugene O'Brien and Claude Baker and then earned his doctorate at Cornell with Steven Stucky and Roberto Sierra. In 2013 Haber married visual artist Anna Schuleit.

Haber has written music for leading new music ensembles and performers including the Kronos Quartet, Alarm Will Sound, Gabriel Kahane, Flux Quartet, and The Knights (orchestra). He has been a fellow at the Aspen Music Festival and Tanglewood Music Festival, and artist colonies including MacDowell Colony, Yaddo, Aaron Copland House, Bogliasco Foundation, the Rockefeller Foundation's Bellagio Center, the Blue Mountain Center, and the Hermitage Artist Retreat.

Haber served as the artistic director of the MATA Festival from 2010 to 2014. His work at the MATA festival was lauded by The New York Times as "a testament to MATA’s enduring mission and to the high standards maintained by its current directors, David T. Little and Yotam Haber." During his final festival The New York Times further remarked "If there is one thing that sets the MATA Festival apart from many of the other contemporary-classical bounties New York regularly produces, it might be a robust international representation, which seems to have grown sharply since Yotam Haber — a Dutch-born global citizen and the festival’s artistic director from 2009 until this year — has been at the helm."

Recent major projects include a commission for a concert length work, A More Convenient Season, for the Alabama Symphony Orchestra with chorus and soloists commemorating the 50th anniversary of an explosion that killed four in a Baptist church in Birmingham on September 15, 1963. In 2015, Haber's first monographic album of chamber music, Torus, was released on Roven Records and distributed by Naxos to wide critical acclaim, hailed by New York's WQXR as "a snapshot of a soul in flux – moving from life to the afterlife, from Israel to New Orleans – a composer looking for a sound and finding something powerful along the way." In 2015 he was commissioned by the Kronos Quartet and Carnegie Hall for the 50 For the Future Project to write break_break_break for string quartet and electronics (electronics by Philip White).

Haber's music has been well received, called "haunting" by New Yorker critic Alex Ross and The New York Times. The New York Times called Haber's From the Book of Maintenance and Sustenance "Alluring" and "Engaging" adding that "Mr. Haber used the soulful lower register of the viola to expressive effect, and its higher register to create intriguing timbres. Fluttering trills unfolded over lone piano notes; bell-like descending piano chords were echoed by gently ascending viola motifs. The piece faded to an enigmatic whisper at the end." Haber was hailed by the Los Angeles Times as one of five classical musicians "2014 Faces To Watch,” and chosen as one of the “30 composers under 40” by Orpheus Chamber Orchestra's Project 440.

== Selected works ==
- LAST SKIN for 8 retuned violins
- We Were All for Sinfonietta
- I AM for Chorus and String Quartet
- On Leaving Brooklyn for Chorus, solo voices, and Violin
- New Ghetto Music for full orchestra, voice, and field recordings of Roman cantors from 1950 to 1960
- between composure and seduction for baroque violin, double bass, percussion
- Hvem er Det (who is it) for two sopranos and mezzo-soprano
- A Wine Dark Sea for string orchestra (commissioned by The Knights Ensemble)
- death will come and she shall have your eyes for string orchestra, voice, field recordings of Roman cantors from 1940 to 1960
- Espresso for Wind Ensemble
- Purity Guaranteed for violin and flute
- Death in Venice for solo trumpet
- The Little Bird Concerto for Nicolet Orchestra

== Awards ==
- 2021 The Benjamin Danks Award from the American Academy of Arts and Letters
- 2020 The Azrieli Commission for Jewish Music
- 2016 DAAD Artists-in-Berlin Program Grant
- 2016 MAP Fund for New Water Music, performed by the Louisiana Philharmonic Orchestra and 100 volunteer community musicians
- 2013 Fromm Foundation Commission
- 2013 New York Foundation for the Arts Fellow
- 2007 Rome Prize
- 2005 Guggenheim Fellowship
- 2004 ASCAP/CBDNA Frederick Fennell Competition
- 2002, 2004 ASCAP Morton Gould Award
