= Christopher Knowles (poet) =

American poet and painter (born 1959)

- Born: May 4, 1959 (age 67); New York City, New York, US
- Occupations: Poet; painter

Christopher Knowles (born 1959) is an American poet and painter. He was born in New York City on May 4, 1959, and at an early age received a diagnosis of possible brain damage. He is often referred to as autistic. In 1976, his poetry was used by Robert Wilson for the avant-garde minimalist Philip Glass opera, Einstein on the Beach. Wilson described his discovery of the then 13-year-old Knowles, in the extended notes to the Tomato Records release of Einstein on the Beach:

In early 1973 a man ... gave me an audio tape ... I was fascinated. The tape was entitled "Emily Likes the TV". On it a young man's voice spoke continuously creating repetitions and variations on phrases about Emily watching the TV. I began to realize that the words flowed to a patterned rhythm whose logic was self-supporting. It was a piece coded much like music. Like a cantata or fugue it worked with conjugations of thoughts repeated in variations...

Wilson cast the teenager Knowles in a number of his productions, including Einstein on the Beach.

In 1978, the American poet John Ashbery wrote in the magazine New York of a volume of Knowles's poetry:

Christopher has the ability to conceive of his works in minute detail before executing them. There is nothing accidental in the typed designs and word lists; they fill their preordained places as accurately as though they had spilled out of a computer. This pure conceptualism, which others have merely approximated using mechanical aids, is one reason that so many young artists have been drawn to Christopher's work.

Early in 2013, Knowles presented several of his poems in a reading at Gavin Brown's Enterprise in the West Village which had mounted an exhibition of his paintings. The same year, the Museum of Modern Art acquired several of Knowles' paintings, or rather "typings" or "typed designs" – pictures created with a typewriter and using colored ink to make patterns from letters and numbers. He starts creating the pictures by writing his signature and works his way up and to the left. Knowles said, he paints all the reds, then all the blues, and so on. One of his pictures consists only of the words "John Simon pollute your anger", inspired by the art critic's dismissive treatment of Robert Wilson (Simon had described Wilson as a charlatan and accused him of exploiting Knowles).

In 2015 the Institute of Contemporary Art, Philadelphia staged "Christopher Knowles: In A Word"—solo exhibition of work spanning Knowles' career. The exhibition traveled to the Contemporary Arts Museum Houston in 2017.

== Collections ==
- NoguerasBlanchard, Madrid / Barcelona, SP
- Brooklyn Museum of Art, Brooklyn, USA
- Fogg Museum, Cambridge, USA
- Museum Boymans-van Beuningen, Rotterdam, NL
- Museum Ludwig (Dr. Peter Ludwig), Cologne, DE
- Museum of Modern Art, New York, US
