= Christopher Mayo =

Canadian composer

Chris Mayo
- Born: 1980 (age 45–46)
- Occupation: composer

Christopher Mayo (born 1980) is a Canadian composer of contemporary classical music.

Born in Toronto, Mayo studied at the University of Toronto where he was awarded the Glenn Gould Composition Prize and the William Erving Fairclough Scholarship and earned an Honours Bachelor of Music Degree. Mayo relocated to London in 2003, where he studied with Julian Anderson and in 2004 obtained a Master of Music in Composition from the Royal College of Music. In 2011 Mayo obtained a PhD in composition from the Royal Academy of Music where he studied with Philip Cashian. Mayo has received numerous awards including the Royal Philharmonic Society Composition Prize in 2005 and the Ensemble contemporain de Montreal's Generation 2010 Audience Prize.

Mayo's work has been commissioned and performed by numerous ensembles and organizations such as the London Symphony Orchestra, the Vancouver Symphony Orchestra, BBC Symphony Orchestra, Tête à Tête Opera), Ensemble contemporain de Montreal, Le Nouvel Ensemble Moderne, ACME (American Contemporary Music Ensemble) and L'arsenale, Motion Ensemble, Handel House Museum, Michael Collins and the Dante Quartet, arraymusic, Carnegie Hall and the MATA Festival. Mayo wrote a piece for inclusion on the NMC Recordings album The NMC Songbook which won the 2009 Gramophone Contemporary Award. Mayo's music has been performed at festivals such as Bang on a Can Summer Music Festival, Aldeburgh Festival and Cheltenham Music Festival. In September 2012, Mayo was announced as the Manchester Camerata Composer in Residence for the 2012/13 season during which time he wrote three new works for the ensemble.

Mayo is a member of the Camberwell Composers Collective along with fellow composers Mark Bowden (composer), Anna Meredith, Emily Hall and Charlie Piper. Together with his fellow Camberwell Composers Collective members, Mayo served as New Music Associate at Kettle's Yard in Cambridge from 2008 to 2010. In 2009 Mayo appeared in the BBC Two television documentary Classic Goldie in which he assisted the UK drum and bass musician Goldie to write a commission for performance in the 2009 Proms season.

Mayo has also undertaken numerous orchestration projects for notable pop music artists including collaborations for the Polaris Music Prize and with Canadian singer-songwriter Carly Rae Jepsen and Canadian Inuk throat singer Tanya Tagaq.

Mayo's recent premieres have included commissions for Crash Ensemble and Alarm Will Sound.

As a distinguished alumni, Mayo was named an Associate of the Royal Academy of Music (ARAM) in their 2018 Honours and Awards list.

Mayo serves as an Adjunct Assistant Professor in the DAN School of Drama and Music at Queen's University where he teaches courses in Sonic Arts, Composition, and Music Theory.
