= Opéra d'Avignon =

Opera house in Avignon, France

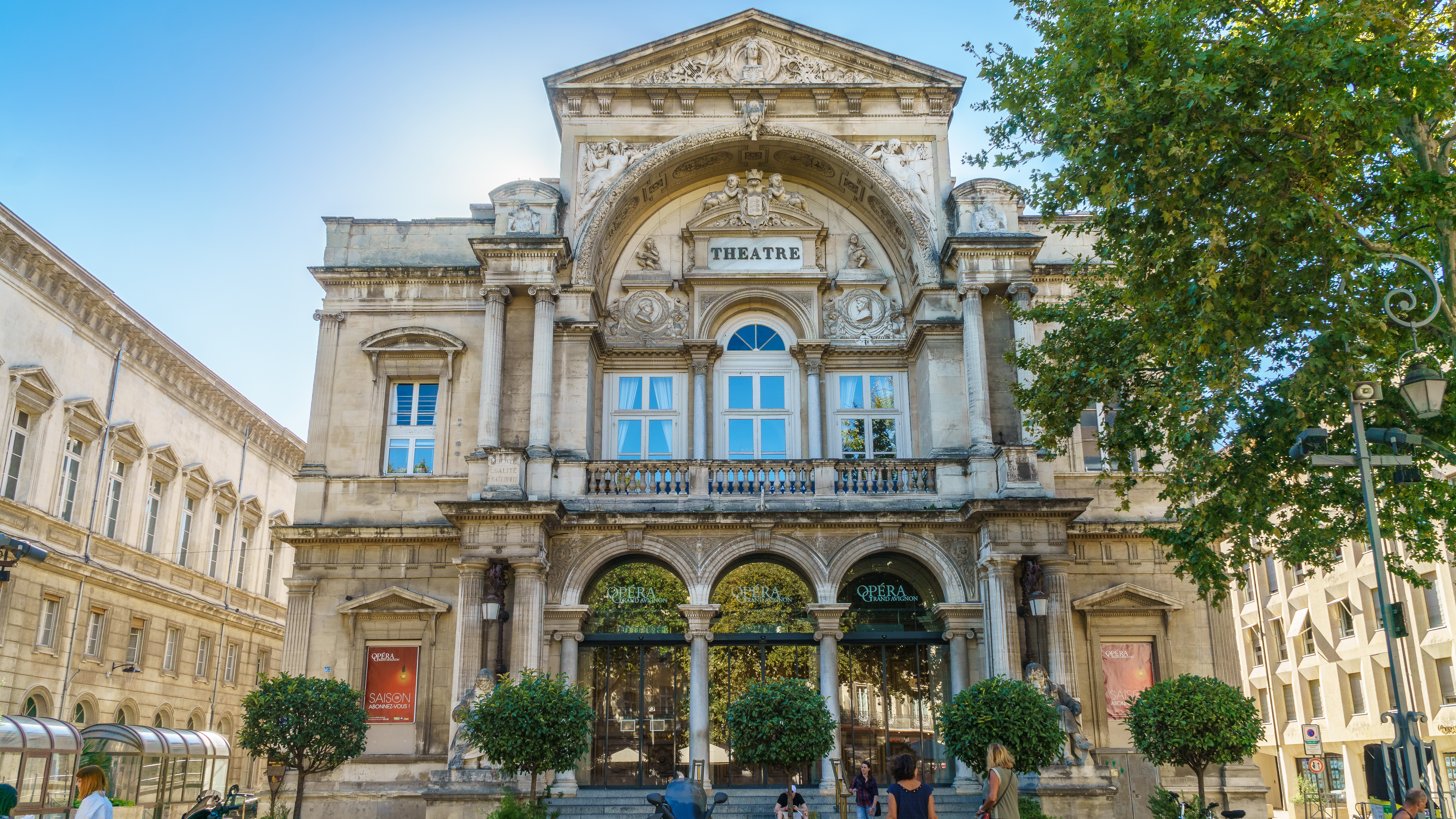
- Interactive map of Opéra d'Avignon
- Address: Place de l'Horloge; Avignon 84000; France
- Coordinates: 43.9497°N 4.8055°E
- Type: Opera house

Construction
- Opened: 1847
- Architects: Léon Feuchère and Théodore Charpentier

Website
- www.operagrandavignon.fr

Monument historique
- Official name: Théâtre municipal
- Designated: 1988
- Reference no.: PA00081948

The Opéra d'Avignon is an opera house located in Avignon, France, that has been in operation for almost two centuries. The initial opera house was constructed in 1824–1825, and opened with its inaugural performance on 30 October 1825. The original opera house was destroyed in a fire on 26 January 1846. The current opera house was built in 1846–1847 and was designed by architects Léon Feuchère and Théodore Charpentier. In 1988, it was designated as a monument historique.
