= Lisa Bielawa =

American composer

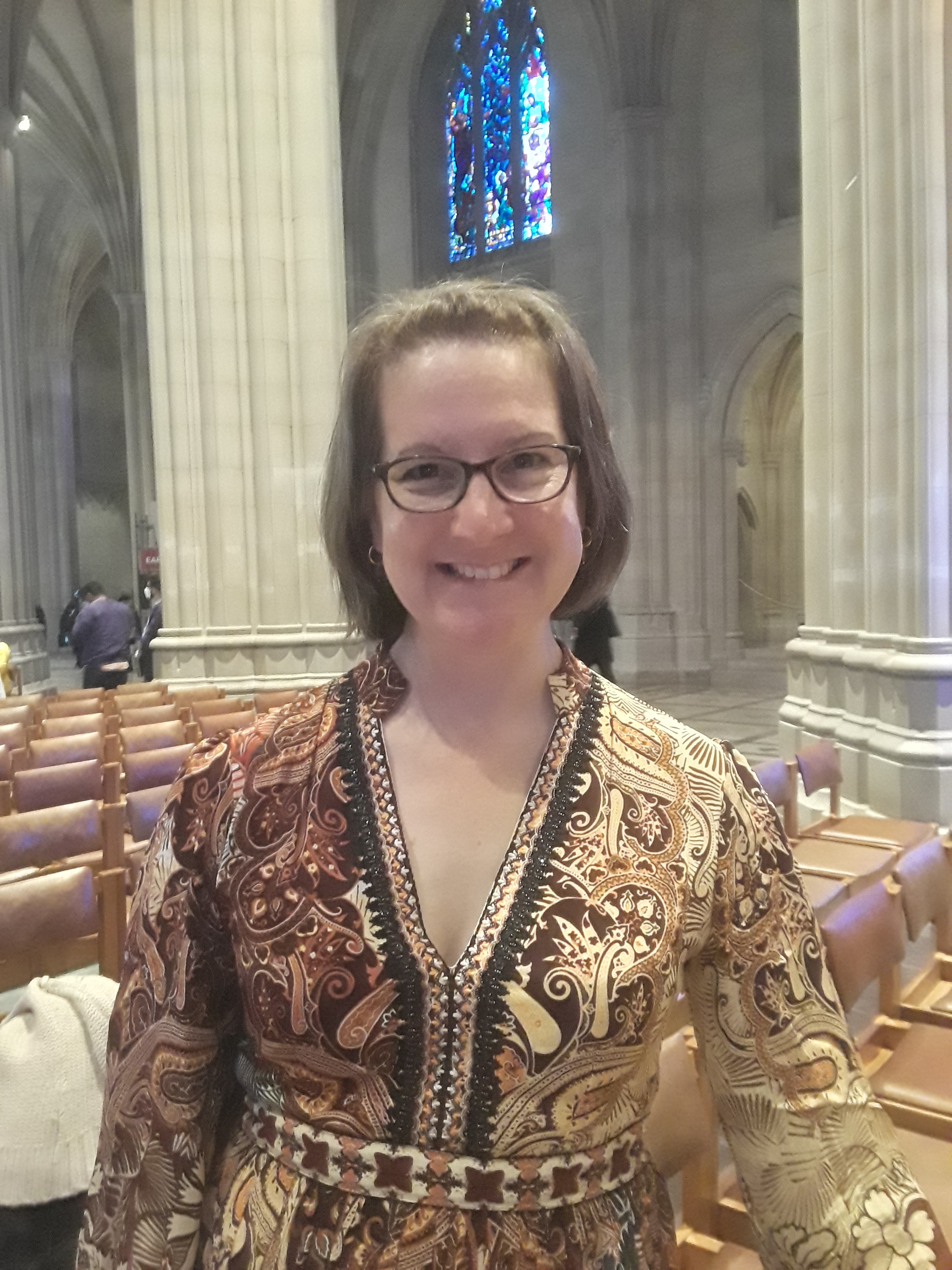
Bielawa after the premiere of her Voters' Litany at the Washington National Cathedral, March 2022

Lisa Carol Bielawa (born September 30, 1968) is a composer and vocalist. She is a 2009 Rome Prize winner in Musical Composition and spent a year composing as a Fellow at the American Academy in Rome.

== Early life and education ==
Bielawa was born in San Francisco. Her father was composer and San Francisco State University music professor Herbert Bielawa. Having been raised in a musical environment, she has been musically active since early childhood, learning piano, voice, and violin in addition to writing music. She continued to perform and write music, but studied English at Yale for her undergraduate degree, and afterwards resumed her career in music.

== Career ==
She moved to New York two weeks after receiving her B.A. in literature in 1990 from Yale University, and became an active participant in New York musical life. She began touring with the Philip Glass Ensemble in 1992. In 1997 she co-founded the MATA Festival, which celebrates the work of young composers. For five years, she was the artistic director of the San Francisco Girls Chorus.

She is the recipient of the 2017 American Academy of Arts and Letters' Music Award and a 2020 Discovery Grant from OPERA America’s Opera Grants for Female Composers. She was named a William Randolph Hearst Visiting Artist Fellow at the American Antiquarian Society for 2018 and is Artist-in-Residence.

== Compositions ==
Bielawa's music has been performed at the NY PHIL BIENNIAL, Lincoln Center, Carnegie Hall, The Kennedy Center, SHIFT Festival, and Naumburg Orchestral Concerts. Orchestras that have performed her music include The Knights, Boston Modern Orchestra Project, American Composers Orchestra, and the Orlando Philharmonic. Premieres of her work have been commissioned and presented by the Chamber Music Society of Lincoln Center, Brooklyn Rider, Seattle Chamber Music Society, and American Guild of Organists.

A complete list of compositions is available on her official website.

Major compositions include:

=== Vireo: The Spiritual Biography of a Witch's Accuser ===
Bielawa received a 2018 Los Angeles Area Emmy nomination for her made-for-TV-and-online opera Vireo: The Spiritual Biography of a Witch's Accuser, created with librettist Erik Ehn and director Charles Otte. Vireo won ASCAP's 47th Annual Deems Taylor/Virgil Thomson Multimedia Award in 2015.

=== Broadcasts ===
For almost a decade, Lisa Bielawa has been creating a series of Broadcasts—works for performance in public spaces. Bielawa's Broadcasts are broadly participatory musical asynchronous performances for any combination of voices and instruments.

Airfield Broadcasts

Bielawa's Airfield Broadcasts is a massive 60-minute work for hundreds of musicians that premiered on the tarmac of the former Tempelhof Airport in Berlin (May 2013) and at Crissy Field in San Francisco (October 2013).

Mauer Broadcast

Mauer Broadcast is a 16-minute composition in which the public has the opportunity to come together and sing memories of the Fall of the Berlin Wall. It was premiered in November 2019 for the 30th anniversary of the Fall.

Broadcast from Home

Broadcast from Home has been realized online throughout the period of the coronavirus lockdown, featuring over 500 submitted testimonies and recorded voices from six continents.

Voters' Broadcast

Bielawa completed Voters’ Broadcast in October 2020. Its mission was to stimulate voter engagement, political awareness, and community participation in challenging lockdown conditions, through the act of giving voice to the concerns of fellow citizens, during the lead-up to the 2020 Presidential election.

Brickyard Broadcast

Brickyard Broadcast is a spatialized work for hundreds of musicians commissioned by North Carolina State University that had its world premiere in a Virtual Reality (VR) environment designed by the digital media teams at the NC State University Libraries in November 2020.

=== Chance Encounter ===
Bielawa's Chance Encounter is a 35-minute piece in, and about, transient public space with texts overheard in transient public space. Chance Encounter has been recorded by The Knights and Susan Narucki for Orange Mountain Music (December 2010), and has been performed in Venice with Lisa Bielawa as the soprano soloist as part of the 12th International Venice Biennale of Architecture, in partnership with urban placemaker Robert Hammond, known for championing New York's High Line.

=== Hypermelodia ===
Writing for The Boston Globe, David Weininger notes that her Hypermelodia (for chamber orchestra, big band, and jazz quartet) is structured like a hypertext novel: during the piece two of the performers choose which section to play next. It was commissioned for and premiered at the 37th Annual Seminar on Contemporary Music for the Young on April 12, 2015, at the Rivers School Conservatory.

== Discography ==
Recordings include "Hildegurls: Electric Ordo Virtutum" (innova recordings, 2009); "A Handful of World" (Tzadik 8039, 2007); "First Takes" (Albany Records TROY941, 2007); "In medias res" (BMOP/sound, 2010); "Chance Encounter" (Orange Mountain Music, 2010); "The Lay of the Love" (innova recordings, 2015); "My Outstretched Hand" (Supertrain Records, 2019); "Vireo: The Spiritual Biography Of A Witch's Accuser" (Orange Mountain Music, 2019).
