= Michael Riesman =

- Genres: Electronic
- Occupations: composer, conductor, keyboardist, and record producer
- Website: Official site

Michael Riesman is a composer, conductor, keyboardist, and record producer, best known as music director of the Philip Glass Ensemble and conductor of nearly all of Glass' film scores.

== Biography ==
Michael Riesman studied composition with Peter Stearns and conducting with Carl Bamberger at the Mannes College of Music and got a B.S. there in 1967. The summer of 1967 he went to the Aspen Music Festival where he studied with Darius Milhaud, and won the student composition prize. He then went on to study composition with Leon Kirchner, Roger Sessions, and Earl Kim at Harvard, where he earned an M.A. and PhD (1972). He was a composer in residence at the Marlboro Music Festival in 1969 and a fellow at Tanglewood in 1970. He was awarded a Fulbright fellowship in 1970 and studied with Gottfried von Einem in Vienna. He moved to New York City in the summer of 1971 and then taught at SUNY-Purchase that winter, leaving in the summer of 1972 to dedicate himself full-time to a performing career.

He had some early successes as a composer, most notably with "Phases", a work for electronically modulated piano, given a premiere in at the Metropolitan Museum in New York by Peter Serkin. The New York Times called the piece "the most interesting work on the program" which consisted of works by major 20th-century figures including Luciano Berio and Olivier Messiaen. Riesman later performed the piece himself at the New York Philharmonic's downtown series at the Public Theater. Another important work was his "Chamber Concerto" which he conducted in a performance with the St. Paul Chamber Orchestra at Carnegie Hall and elsewhere.

In 1974 he was invited by Philip Glass to join his Ensemble as a keyboard player and has been a member ever since. In the years since, his role with Glass expanded and he took on the duties of music director and conductor, encompassing arranging, personnel management, and conducting theatrical and film works.

He has released just one album of his own music, "Formal Abandon", which was written as a dance work for the choreographer Lucinda Childs and premiered at the Brooklyn Academy of Music.

As conductor, he has an appeared with orchestras such as the New York Philharmonic and Los Angeles Philharmonic, and has two Grammy nominations, for "The Photographer" and "Kundun". As piano soloist, he has appeared with the Chicago and Milwaukee Symphony Orchestras, among others.

He has released 5 albums of music for solo piano. All are arrangements of film scores by Glass: The Hours; Dracula; a compilation called Philip Glass Soundtracks; a sequel, Philip Glass Soundtracks Vol. II; and Beauty and the Beast. He has many album credits as conductor, keyboardist, and producer.

As a student at Harvard he took a course in computer science and has maintained an involvement in computers and music technology through his career. This has included working as a beta tester and consultant for companies such as digidesign (now Avid) and Peavey, and writing music software for his own use.

He is married to Elizabeth Blakeslee Riesman, a retired Montessori teacher, and lives in New York City.

== Discography ==
| Year | Album | Role |
|---|---|---|
| 1979 | Einstein On The Beach | Conductor, Keyboards, Producer |
| 1982 | Glassworks | Conductor, Keyboards, Producer |
| 1983 | Hearts and Bones - Paul Simon | Conductor |
| 1983 | Carmina Burana - Ray Manzarek | Synthesizers, Orchestrations, Conductor |
| 1983 | Koyaanisqatsi (Original Soundtrack) | Conductor, Keyboards, Producer |
| 1984 | The Photographer | Conductor, Keyboards, Producer |
| 1985 | Mishima (Original Soundtrack) | Conductor, Keyboards, Producer |
| 1986 | Satyagraha | Keyboards, Producer |
| 1986 | Songs from Liquid Days | Conductor |
| 1987 | Formal Abandon (LP) | Composer, Keyboards, Producer |
| 1987 | Akhnaten | Keyboards, Producer |
| 1988 | Powaqqatsi (Original Soundtrack) | Conductor, Keyboards, Producer |
| 1990 | Passages - Ravi Shankar and Philip Glass | Conductor, Keyboards, Producer |
| 1993 | Black Tie White Noise - David Bowie | Conductor, Arranger |
| 1993 | Anima Mundi | Conductor, Keyboards, Producer |
| 1993 | Einstein on the Beach | Conductor, Keyboards, Producer |
| 1993 | Jesus' Blood Never Failed Me Yet - Gavin Bryars | Conductor, Keyboards, Producer |
| 1995 | La Belle Et La Bête | Conductor, Keyboards, Producer |
| 1997 | Kundun (Original Soundtrack) | Conductor, Keyboards, Producer |
| 1998 | Koyaanisqatsi (New Recording) | Conductor, Keyboards, Producer |
| 2002 | A Descent into the Maelström | Conductor, Keyboards, Producer |
| 2002 | Early Voice | Conductor, Keyboards, Producer |
| 2002 | Naqoyqatsi (Original Soundtrack) | Conductor, Keyboards, Producer |
| 2002 | The Hours (Original Soundtrack) | Piano, Producer |
| 2003 | Music from the Thin Blue Line | Conductor, Keyboards, Producer |
| 2004 | Music from The Hours (solo piano) | Piano, Arranger |
| 2004 | The Fog of War (Original Soundtrack) | Conductor, Keyboards, Producer |
| 2005 | Orion | Conductor, Keyboards, Producer |
| 2005 | The Music of Undertow | Conductor, Keyboards, Producer |
| 2006 | The Illusionist (Original Soundtrack) | Conductor, Keyboards, Producer |
| 2007 | Dracula | Piano, Arranger |
| 2007 | Book of Longing | Conductor, Keyboards, Producer |
| 2007 | Cassandra's Dream | Conductor, Keyboards, Producer |
| 2007 | Monsters of Grace | Conductor, Keyboards, Producer |
| 2007 | Notes on a Scandal | Conductor, Keyboards, Producer |
| 2008 | Philip Glass Soundtracks (solo piano) | Piano, Arranger |
| 2008 | Animals in Love | Conductor, Keyboards, Producer |
| 2008 | Music in Twelve Parts (Live Album) | Conductor, Keyboards, Producer |
| 2008 | Neverwas (Original Soundtrack) | Conductor, Keyboards, Producer |
| 2010 | The Philip Glass Ensemble: A Retrospective (Live Album) | Music Director, Keyboards |
| 2011 | Glassworks Live at Le Poisson Rouge | Piano/Keyboards, Producer |
| 2013 | Voices for Didgeridoo & Organ; Organ Suite | Organ, Arranger, Producer |
| 2013 | Symphony No. 3 - Suite from The Hours | Piano, Arranger, Producer |
| 2014 | Koyaanisqatsi - Live, Philip Glass Ensemble & The New York Philharmonic | Conductor, Mixing |
