= Philip Glass Ensemble =

American musical group

- Origin: New York City, New York, United States
- Genres: Minimalism; Avant-garde; Opera; Vocal music
- Occupation: Chamber ensemble
- Years active: 1968–present
- Labels: Sony Classical Records; CBS Records International; Orange Mountain Music; Tomato
- Members: Michael Riesman; Philip Glass; Dan Dryden; Eleanor Sandresky; Nelson Padgett; Ted Baker; Lisa Bielawa; Andrew Sterman; Mick Rossi; Frank Cassara; Peter Hess; Sam Sadigursky; Dan Bora; Ryan Kelly
- Past members: Stephen Erb; Jon Gibson; Martin Goldray; Richard Peck; Jack Kripl; Richard Landry; Joan La Barbara; Seymour Barab; Iris Hiskey; Dora Ohrenstein; Kurt Munkacsi; David Crowell
- Website: philipglassensemble.com philipglass.com

The Philip Glass Ensemble is an American musical group founded by composer Philip Glass in 1968 to serve as a performance outlet for his experimental minimalist music. The ensemble continues to perform and record to this day, under the musical direction of keyboardist Michael Riesman.

The Ensemble's instrumentation became a hallmark of Glass's early minimalist style. While the ensemble's instrumentation has varied over the years, it has generally consisted of amplified woodwinds (typically saxophones, flutes, and bass clarinet), keyboard synthesizers, and solo soprano voice (singing solfeggio).

After Glass wrote his first opera, Einstein on the Beach, for the ensemble in 1976, he began to compose for other instrumentation more frequently, but he still retains the core ensemble instrumentation.

In 2011, individuals from the ensemble performed a series of concerts in an installation at the Metropolitan Museum of Art in the Temple of Dendur exhibit. From 2012 until late 2015 the ensemble has presented, along with many other performers, a revival of Einstein on the Beach which opened in Montpellier, France in 2012.

In 2013 the ensemble began to perform Glass's opera, La Belle et la Bête again. The opera is set to the visuals of the 1946 Jean Cocteau film, with the help of four vocalists. In early September 2014 the ensemble performed with Steve Reich and other musicians at the Brooklyn Academy of Music's "Next Wave Festival." It had been over thirty years since Glass and Reich had shared a stage.

In February 2018, the ensemble performed with the San Francisco Girls Chorus at Carnegie Hall. They performed the ninety-minute Music With Changing Parts, the work's debut performance with women's chorus and an extremely important concert as this piece is considered to have changed music in the 1970s. Glass has also collaborated with them on their most recent album, Final Answer, and many of his works are featured in performance by SFGC (artistically directed by Ensemble vocalist and keyboardist Lisa Bielawa).

== Members ==
- Michael Riesman, keyboards
- Philip Glass, keyboards
- Dan Dryden, audio engineer
- Eleanor Sandresky, keyboards
- Nelson Padgett, keyboards
- Ted Baker, keyboards
- Lisa Bielawa, voice
- Andrew Sterman, woodwinds
- Mick Rossi, percussion, keyboards
- Frank Cassara, percussion
- Peter Hess, woodwinds
- Dan Bora, audio engineer
- Ryan Kelly, onstage audio engineer

=== Featured vocalists in La Belle et la Bête ===
- Gregory Purnhagen, baritone
- Peter Stewart, bass
- Marie Mascari, soprano
- Hai-Ting Chin, mezzo-soprano
- Alexandra Montano, mezzo-soprano (deceased)
- Janice Felty, mezzo-soprano (still active in the opera world)
- Anna-Maria Martinez, soprano (still active in the opera world)

=== Former members ===
- Stephen Erb, audio engineer
- Martin Goldray, keyboards
- Jon Gibson, woodwinds
- Bob Telson, keyboards
- Steve Reich, keyboards
- Art Murphy, keyboards
- Steve Chambers, keyboards
- James Tenney, keyboards
- Robert Prado, trumpet, flute, and keyboards
- Richard Peck, woodwinds
- Jack Kripl, woodwinds
- Richard Landry, woodwinds
- David Crowell, woodwinds
- Joan La Barbara, voice and keyboards
- Iris Hiskey, voice and keyboards
- Dora Ohrenstein, voice and keyboards
- Barbara Benary, violin and voice
- David Behrman, viola
- Beverly Lauridsen, cello
- Seymour Barab, cello
- Kurt Munkacsi, audio engineer (now a studio producer)

== Films ==
- 1982 – Koyaanisqatsi. Directed by Godfrey Reggio.
- 1983 – Philip Glass. From Four American Composers. Directed by Peter Greenaway.
- 1988 – Powaqqatsi. Directed by Godfrey Reggio.
- 2002 – Naqoyqatsi. Directed by Godfrey Reggio.
- 2008 – Glass: A Portrait of Philip in Twelve Parts. Directed by Scott Hicks.
