= Emma Hodcroft =

Scottish-American epidemiologist

Emma B. Hodcroft
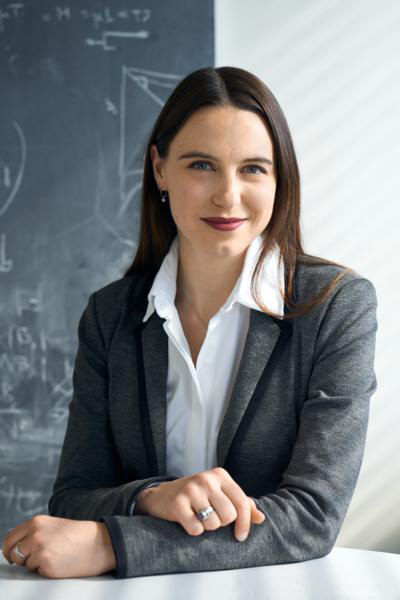
- Emma Hodcroft
- Born: 1986 (age 39–40)
- Citizenship: American
- Education: Texas Christian University (TCU), University of Edinburgh
- Known for: Nextstrain
- Parents: Ken Hodcroft (father); Ellen Louise Boyer (mother)
- Scientific career
- Fields: Microbiology, Bioinformatics
- Workplaces: University of Bern; Swiss TPH
- Website: emmahodcroft.com

Emma Hodcroft (born 1986) is a British-American molecular epidemiologist at the Institute for Social and Preventive Medicine at the University of Basel. Her research focuses on the phylogenetics of viruses and other pathogens, mapping the spread and evolution of different genetic variants. Hodcroft is a developer on the Nextstrain project, an open science project that tracks the transmission chains of SARS-CoV-2 and other pathogens. In 2020, she originated CoVariants.org, a project tracking SARS-CoV-2 variants.

Nextstrain's work gained global prominence during the COVID-19 pandemic and have been cited widely in scientific and media coverage. As a scientist tracking the spread of the virus across the globe, Hodcroft has co-authored papers on topics including how the early pandemic spread from country to country, the potential for seasonality, and the prevalence and spread of variants of concern.

== Early life and education ==
Hodcroft was born to an American mother, Ellen Louise Boyer, and British father, Ken Hodcroft. After her parents divorced, she and her two younger siblings split their year between Texas and Scotland.

Hodcroft studied for her undergraduate degree in biology at Texas Christian University (TCU). She worked with Professor John Horner, studying the carnivorous Sarracenia alata pitcher plants, studying the genetic variation among geographically distinct plant populations. This work showed that clonal reproduction, thought to be common among the species, was in fact quite low.

Later, Hodcroft studied for a master's degree at the University of Edinburgh, which she received with distinction. Her thesis looked for evidence of adaptive selection in Drosophila, by comparing the rate of changes across tissue types, periods of time, and between immune-related and non-immune related functions.

Hodcroft received her Ph.D. at Edinburgh with Prof. Andrew Leigh Brown. Her thesis studied the phylogenetic factors influencing viral load in HIV. Her three-minute summary of her thesis won the school- and country-level award in the 3 Minute Thesis Competition and placed third in the global competition.

== Research and career ==
Hodcroft's research has focused on computational methods of tracking genetic changes in pathogens and their impact on disease and epidemiological dynamics. She is currently a post-doc working on Nextstrain with Richard Neher.

=== Human immunodeficiency virus (HIV) ===
Hodcroft's doctoral work studied the phylogenetic factors influencing viral load in HIV, analysing the genetic sequences of 8,500 HIV samples in the United Kingdom. She found that variations in HIV B strains were responsible for only a small fraction in the variations of viral load in patients, while HIV C strains showed a greater degree of viral influence over viral load. She completed her first postdoctoral position with the PANGEA_HIV initiative, continuing in the laboratory of Leigh Brown. Hodcroft developed a stochastic, agent-based model for the simulation of HIV epidemics in Africa developed south of the Sahara.

=== Nextstrain ===
Hodcroft is a developer on the Nextstrain project, an open science project that tracks the transmission chains of SARS-CoV-2 and other pathogens. Her work included expanding Nextstrain to efficiently analyse bacterial pathogens, which have significantly larger genomes than viruses.

Hodcroft's research then focused on Enterovirus D68, the virus implicated in outbreaks of a polio-like disorder called acute flaccid myelitis. The work culminated in publishing a phylogenetic analysis of the evolution, geographic spread, and demographic distribution of the pathogen.

=== SARS-CoV-2 ===
During the COVID-19 pandemic, scientific and public interest in viral dynamics soared. Hodcroft made significant contributions maintaining ongoing analysis of the outbreak in Nextstrain, starting a new site to track SARS-CoV-2 variants, and explaining the outbreak dynamics to the public. As a scientist tracking the spread of the virus across the globe, Hodcroft has published and been quoted on multiple topics, including how the early pandemic spread from country to country, the potential for seasonality, and the prevalence and spread of variants of concern.

Early in the pandemic, Hodcroft became intrigued by how a lone traveller from Singapore could have trigger a rash of cases in the United Kingdom. She posted an infographic on Twitter tracking the spread from the Singapore traveller, to fellow guests at a ski chalet in Switzerland, to the outbreak in the UK. A colleague suggested she publish the work, she posted the article on 26 February and it was published the next day in Swiss Medical Weekly.

Over the following months, phylogenetic analysis and open science platforms like Nextstrain played a key role in efforts to understand the epidemic. This work helped to understand transmission patterns, track key mutations, and estimate the speed of epidemic spread. In October 2020, Hodcroft and the Nextstrain team published an analysis that showed that the strain driving an emerging wave in the United Kingdom had first emerged in Spain — indicating that holiday travel to and from Spain was a likely source of the outbreak. Hodcroft has published on the history of competing SARS-CoV-2 strains to better understand the emergence of variants of concern. Hodcroft has written about the round-the-clock nature of gathering, analysing, error-checking, and annotating the flood of genomic data from around the world.

In March 2021, Hodcroft was the lead author of a commentary in Nature about how the scientific community could track virus variants faster. The article recommended ways to "fix the bioinformatics bottleneck," including improving the rules and incentives for data sharing, rethinking incentives for midcareer academics, and accommodating the challenges of analysing vast volumes of data, often from labs that have not previously collected and reported data in such volumes. It pointed out that much of the genetic tracking of SARS-CoV-2 had not been performed by public health authorities, but rather by mid-career academics who set aside their research to help the pandemic efforts. The article called on the scientific community to rethink the incentives for these researchers, so their efforts would not set back their careers. Similarly, the article called on the community to find ways to standardize data sharing, and to ensure that researchers can share data prior to publication without having their own findings pre-empted.

In 2020, she originated CoVariants.org, a project tracking SARS-CoV-2 variants.

Hodcroft has also emerged as a science communicator, both on social media and in the press. She has been quoted in articles about the transmission of the virus, about the debunking of the theory that the virus was artificially created, and describing the role of holiday travel in spreading the virus, and the impact of emerging variants of concern.

== Presentations ==
Hodcroft has presented her work on HIV at Conference on Retroviruses and Opportunistic Infections (CROI) 2012 in Seattle, Washington, and CROI 2013 in Atlanta, Georgia, and at many conferences, including the 45th Population Genetics Group Conference in Nottingham, England, and the 19th, 20th, and 21st HIV Dynamics and Evolution Conferences in Asheville, North Carolina; Utrecht, the Netherlands; and Tucson, Arizona.

== Awards ==
Hodcroft's entry in the 2014 Three Minute Thesis competition, "Do some strains of HIV make people sick more quickly than others?" won first prize and the 'people's choice' award at the University of Edinburgh finals of the '3 Minute Thesis competition'. A video of the presentation placed 3rd in the world-wide Universitas 21 competition in 2014.

The Nextstrain tool, co-developed by Hodcroft, received a Webby Special Achievement Award in May 2020.

In March 2021, The New York Times listed Hodcroft as a scientist in a new generation "changing the landscape of leadership" for women in science.
