= Trevor Bedford (virologist) =

American computational virologist

- Education: University of Chicago (BA); Harvard University (Ph.D.)
- Known for: First warning of community spread of COVID-19 in the United States
- Medical career
- Profession: Computational virologist

Trevor Bedford is an American computational virologist at Fred Hutchinson Cancer Research Center. His research focuses on tools to speed the process of using genomic sequencing data to map the evolutionary trees of pathogens -- and thus yield insights into geographic spread, epidemic growth rate, and vaccine efficacy.

Starting with an early system called Nextflu in 2015, Bedford and Richard A. Neher co-developed Nextstrain, an open source system for computing viral evolutionary trees from sequencing data. In 2020, Bedford was able to use data from the Flu Tracking Project and Nextstrain to first document community transmission of SARS-CoV-2 in the United States.

He is listed as author, together with a number of Nextstrain colleagues (Neher, Emma Hodcroft, Cornelius Roemer) and 25 others, of Urgent need for a non-discriminatory and non-stigmatizing nomenclature for monkeypox virus, published in August 2022.

In 2021, the MacArthur Foundation recognized Bedford's work, naming him a 2021 MacArthur fellow.

== Education and career ==
Bedford graduated with a BA in Biological Sciences from the University of Chicago in 2002 and obtained a Ph.D. in Biology from Harvard University in 2008.

In 2020, he posted on Twitter about the first known community transmission of COVID-19 in the United States. That action was later cited as one of the actions that helped galvanize a rapid response to Covid on a national scale.

In September 2021, he received a 7-year $9 million grant from the Howard Hughes Medical Institute. Later that same month, he was named as part of that year's MacArthur Fellows Program class.

== Selected publications ==
- Hadfield, James; Megill, Colin; Bell, Sidney M.; Huddleston, John; Potter, Barney; Callender, Charlton; Sagulenko, Pavel; Bedford, Trevor; Neher, Richard A. (2018). "Nextstrain: Real-time tracking of pathogen evolution". Bioinformatics. 34 (23): 4121–4123. doi:10.1093/bioinformatics/bty407. PMC 6247931. PMID 29790939.
- Corey, Lawrence; Beyrer, Chris; Cohen, Myron S.; Michael, Nelson L.; Bedford, Trevor; Rolland, Morgane (2021). "SARS-CoV-2 Variants in Patients with Immunosuppression". New England Journal of Medicine. 385 (6): 562–566. doi:10.1056/NEJMsb2104756. PMC 8494465. PMID 34347959. S2CID 236927966.
- Perchetti, Garrett A.; Zhu, Haiying; Mills, Margaret G.; Shrestha, Lasata; Wagner, Cassia; Bakhash, Shah Mohamed; Lin, Michelle J.; Xie, Hong; Huang, Meei-Li; Mathias, Patrick; Bedford, Trevor; Jerome, Keith R.; Greninger, Alexander L.; Roychoudhury, Pavitra (2021). "Specific allelic discrimination of N501Y and other SARS-CoV-2 mutations by DDPCR detects B.1.1.7 lineage in Washington State". Journal of Medical Virology. 93 (10): 5931–5941. doi:10.1002/jmv.27155. PMC 8427099. PMID 34170525.
- Bedford, Trevor; et al. (2020). "Cryptic transmission of SARS-CoV-2 in Washington state". Science. 370 (6516): 571–575. doi:10.1126/science.abc0523. PMC 7810035. PMID 32913002.
- Annavajhala, Medini K.; Mohri, Hiroshi; Wang, Pengfei; Nair, Manoj; Zucker, Jason E.; Sheng, Zizhang; Gomez-Simmonds, Angela; Kelley, Anne L.; Tagliavia, Maya; Huang, Yaoxing; Bedford, Trevor; Ho, David D.; Uhlemann, Anne-Catrin (2021). "Emergence and expansion of SARS-CoV-2 B.1.526 after identification in New York". Nature. 597 (7878): 703–708. Bibcode:2021Natur.597..703A. doi:10.1038/s41586-021-03908-2. PMC 8481122. PMID 34428777. S2CID 237292353.
- Kinganda-Lusamaki, Eddy; Black, Allison; Mukadi, Daniel B.; Hadfield, James; Mbala-Kingebeni, Placide; Pratt, Catherine B.; Aziza, Amuri; Diagne, Moussa M.; White, Bailey; Bisento, Nella; Nsunda, Bibiche; Akonga, Marceline; Faye, Martin; Faye, Ousmane; Edidi-Atani, Francois; Matondo-Kuamfumu, Meris; Mambu-Mbika, Fabrice; Bulabula, Junior; Di Paola, Nicholas; Pauthner, Matthias G.; Andersen, Kristian G.; Palacios, Gustavo; Delaporte, Eric; Sall, Amadou Alpha; Peeters, Martine; Wiley, Michael R.; Ahuka-Mundeke, Steve; Bedford, Trevor; Tamfum, Jean-Jacques Muyembe (2021). "Integration of genomic sequencing into the response to the Ebola virus outbreak in Nord Kivu, Democratic Republic of the Congo". Nature Medicine. 27 (4): 710–716. doi:10.1038/s41591-021-01302-z. PMC 8549801. PMID 33846610. S2CID 233222329.
