= 3MT =

3MT may refer to:

- 3-Methoxytyramine, a metabolite
- 3MT (radio station), an Australian radio station
- 3MT Venue, a theatre in Manchester, England
- Three Minute Thesis, an academic competition for PhD students
