= Dittberner =

Dittberner may refer to:

- Dittberner Associates, an international market research and consulting firm specializing in the telecommunications industry
- Horst Dittberner, the winner (producer), along with Leonard Bernstein (conductor) of a Grammy Award in 1993 for Mahler's Symphony No. 9
- Hugo Dittberner (born 1944), German writer
