= Keith R. Jerome =

American virologist

- Education: Georgetown College; Duke University
- Scientific career
- Fields: Virology
- Institutions: University of Washington

Keith R. Jerome is an American virologist whose research focuses on viruses such as herpes simplex, HIV and hepatitis B that persist in their hosts. He published on the first known case of COVID-19 in the United States detecting SARS-CoV-2 in Washington State and helped forge the nation's COVID-19 testing. In 2021, Jerome and Alexander Greninger shared the Washington Innovator of the Year award for developing the laboratory based assay for detecting COVID-19. He was senior author on a research article published in Science describing the cryptic transmission of SARS-CoV-2 alongside Trevor Bedford, Alexander Greninger, Jay Shendure, and Helen Chu. Regarding the origin of SARS-CoV-2 he reported that the live market in Wuhan was more likely than a lab leak of the virus.

Jerome studies the ways in which these viruses evade the immune system and potential therapies for these infections. Jerome and his colleagues study the uses of precision gene-editing tools like CRISPR/Cas9 to remove damaging viral genes that have tucked themselves into a person's genetic code or to insert genes that can protect cells from invading viruses. He has been working for years on research aimed at a cure for Herpes virus by using the DNA-cutting tools of gene therapy. Initial research showed these techniques could knock out small quantities of latent virus. He and his colleagues are exploring this approach in combination with blood stem cell transplants as a means of curing HIV.

== Academic and medical appointments ==
- Professor, Department of Laboratory Medicine and Pathology, University of Washington, 2012–present
- Head, Virology Division, Laboratory Medicine, University of Washington, 2012–present
- Full professor, Fred Hutchinson Cancer Research Center, 2015–present

== Education and training ==
- Georgetown College, B.S., Chemistry, summa cum laude, 1985
- Duke University, PhD, Microbiology and Immunology, 1992
- Duke University, MD, May 1993
- Resident Physician, Department of Pathology, University of Washington, 1993-1995
- Resident Physician, Department of Laboratory Medicine, University of Washington, 1995-1997
- Senior Fellow, Virology Division, Department of Laboratory Medicine, University of Washington, 1997-1998

== Selected publications ==
- Jerome, Keith R.; Barnd, Donna L.; Bendt, Katharine M.; et al. (1991-06-01). "Cytotoxic T-Lymphocytes Derived from Patients with Breast Adenocarcinoma Recognize an Epitope Present on the Protein Core of a Mucin Molecule Preferentially Expressed by Malignant Cells". Cancer Research. 51 (11): 2908–2916.
- Jerome, Keith R.; Fox, Richard; Chen, Zheng; et al. (1999-11-01). "Herpes Simplex Virus Inhibits Apoptosis through the Action of Two Genes, Us5 and Us3". Journal of Virology. 73 (11): 8950–8957. doi:10.1128/jvi.73.11.8950-8957.1999. PMC 112926. PMID 10516000.
- Bhatraju, Pavan K.; Ghassemieh, Bijan J.; Nichols, Michelle; et al. (2020-05-21). "Covid-19 in Critically Ill Patients in the Seattle Region - Case Series". The New England Journal of Medicine. 382 (21): 2012–2022. doi:10.1056/NEJMoa2004500. PMC 7143164. PMID 32227758.
- Nalla, Arun K.; Casto, Amanda M.; Huang, Meei-Li W.; et al. (2020-05-26). "Comparative Performance of SARS-CoV-2 Detection Assays Using Seven Different Primer-Probe Sets and One Assay Kit". Journal of Clinical Microbiology. 58 (6): e00557-20. doi:10.1128/jcm.00557-20. PMC 7269385. PMID 32269100.
- Joung, Julia; Ladha, Alim; Saito, Makoto; et al. (2020-09-16). "Detection of SARS-CoV-2 with SHERLOCK One-Pot Testing". New England Journal of Medicine. 383 (15): 1492–1494. doi:10.1056/NEJMc2026172. PMC 7510942. PMID 32937062.
- Bedford, Trevor; Greninger, Alexander L.; Roychoudhury, Pavitra; et al. (2020-09-10). "Cryptic transmission of SARS-CoV-2 in Washington state". Science. 370 (6516): 571–575. doi:10.1126/science.abc0523. PMC 7276023. PMID 32511596.
- Perchetti, Garrett A.; Huang, Meei-Li; Mills, Margaret G.; Jerome, Keith R.; Greninger, Alexander L. (2021-02-18). "Analytical Sensitivity of the Abbott BinaxNOW COVID-19 Ag Card". Clinical Microbiology. 59 (3): e02880-20. doi:10.1128/jcm.02880-20. PMC 8106729. PMID 33310764.
