= Lower Saxony State Prize =

German award

The Lower Saxony State Prize (German: Niedersächsischer Staatspreis) has been awarded by the State of Lower Saxony since 2002. From 1978 to 1999 it was called the Lower Saxony Prize (German: Niedersachsenpreis). The award is presented by the Prime Minister of Lower Saxony. The prize has been awarded to personalities who have made outstanding services to the state through their outstanding work in the fields of culture, women, social affairs, science, the environment or the economy. The award is endowed with €35,000 and can be shared. The award winners are selected by a voluntary jury consisting of up to ten people from Lower Saxony.

== Recipients Lower Saxony Prize ==
Jahr	Journalism	Culture	Science
1978	Walter Kempowski	Knabenchor Hannover (conductor: Heinz Hennig)	Reinhold Tüxen
1979	Fritz Wolf	Eduard Lohse	Georg Schnath
1980	Wolfgang Wagner	Richard Oelze	Manfred Eigen
1981	Westermanns Monatshefte	Dieter Oesterlen	Heinz Hundeshagen
1982	Friedrich Bohne	Helmut Ottenjann	Walter Bruch
1983	Walther Killy	Alfred Koerppen	Günther Patzig
1984	Hugo Dittberner	Emil Cimiotti	Fritz Sennheiser
1985	Guntram Vesper	Karl-Heinz Kämmerling	Günter Schmahl
1986	—	Harry und Guntram Hillebrand	Franz Wieacker
1986	—	Jürgen Ahrend	—
1987	Franz Schmedt	Mädchenchor Hannover	Rudolf Pichlmayr
1988	—	Arne Eggebrecht	Madjid Samii, Hellmut Glubrecht
1989	—	Richard Jakoby	Fritz Peter Schäfer, Albrecht Schöne
1990	—	Helen Donath	Paul Raabe, Erwin Neher
1991	Kurt Morawietz	Henri Nannen	Bernhard Ulrich
1992	Eike Christian Hirsch	Lajos Rovátkay	Manfred R. Schroeder
1993	Ruth Klüger	Christiane Möbus	Andreas Büchting
1994	Petra Muschaweck-Kürten	Thomas Quasthoff	Ernst G. Bauer
1995	Tilman Zülch	Ruth Falazik	Jens Frahm
1996	Oskar Negt	Sabine Meyer	Hans-Georg Musmann
1997	Uri Avnery	Gunter Hampel	Wolfgang Junge
1998	Heinz Ludwig Arnold	Doris Dörrie	Ernst Schubert
1999	Gerlind Reinshagen	Ingo Metzmacher	Heinz Haferkamp

- 2000 award not given
- 2001 Timm Ulrichs, Jürgen Großmann

== Recipients Lower Saxony State Prize ==
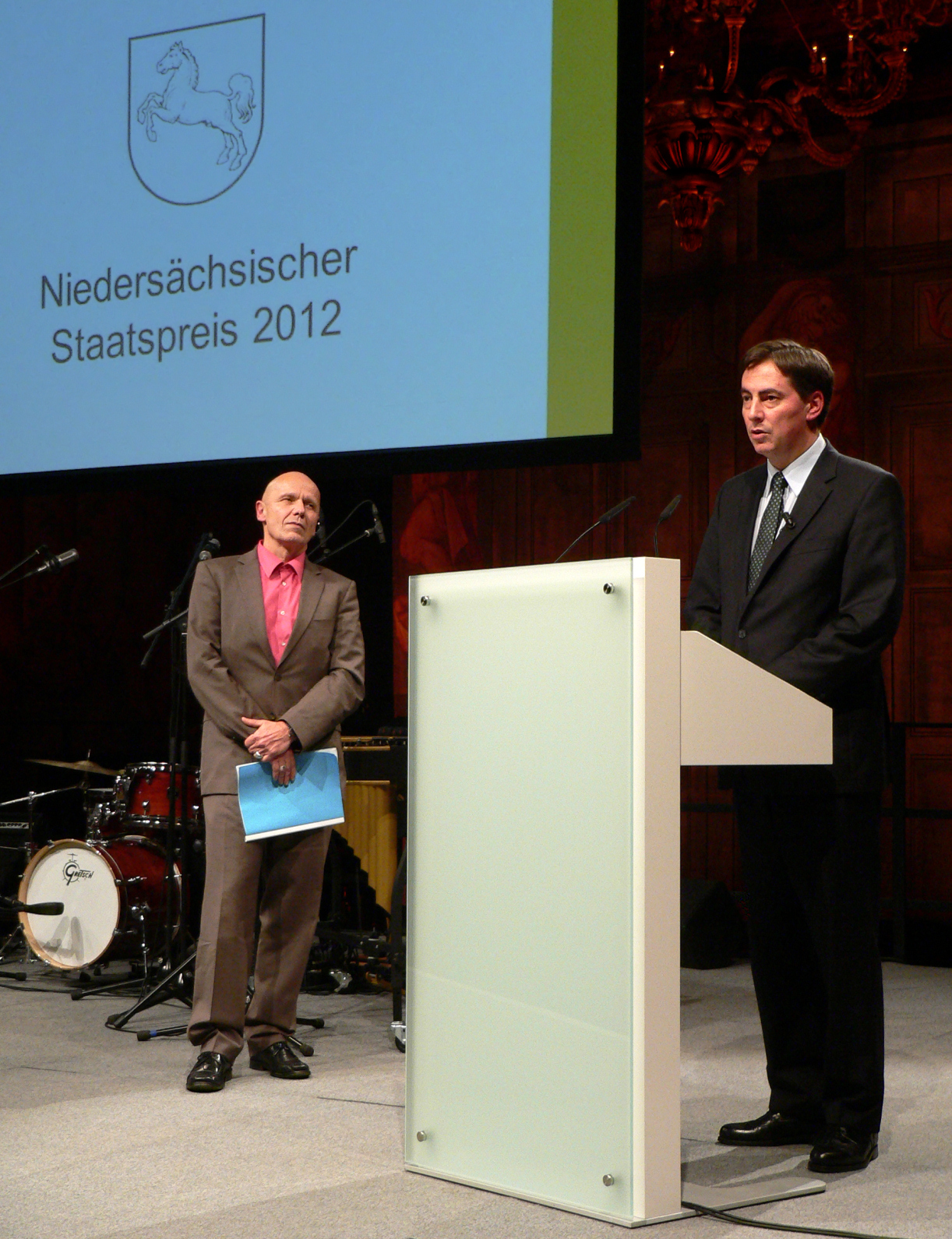
Georg Klein awarded with the Niedersächsischer Staatspreis 2012 from Ministerpräsident David McAllister

- 2002 Axel Haverich
- 2003 Georg Baselitz
- 2004 Peter Gruss
- 2005 Hans Georg Näder, Christiane Iven
- 2006 Gerhard Steidl, Christian von Bar
- 2007 Heinz Rudolf Kunze, Eva-Maria Neher
- 2008 Stefan Hell
- 2009 Aloys Wobben, Heinrich Riebesehl
- 2010 Wilhelm Krull, Ulrich Tukur
- 2012 Georg Klein, Ulrich Reimers
- 2014 Gudrun Schröfel, Scorpions (Rudolf Schenker, Klaus Meine und Matthias Jabs)
- 2016 Bruce Allen, Alessandra Buonanno, Karsten Danzmann
- 2018 Stefan Aust, Jan-Dieter Bruns
- 2020 Igor Levit, Edith Bischof
- 2022 Eske Nannen, Otto Waalkes
- 2024 Düzen Tekkal, Heinrich Detering
