= Greninger =

Greninger is a surname. Notable people with the surname include:

- Alden Buchanan Greninger (1907–1998), namesake of the Greninger chart
- Alexander Greninger, American virologist
