= COVID-19 testing in the United States =

Testing for COVID-19 in the United States of America

COVID-19 testing in the United States can identify whether a person is infected with SARS-CoV-2, the virus which causes COVID-19. This helps health professionals ascertain how bad the epidemic is and where it is worst. The accuracy of national statistics on the number of cases and deaths from the outbreak depend on knowing how many people are being tested every day, and how the available tests are being allocated.

== Timeline ==
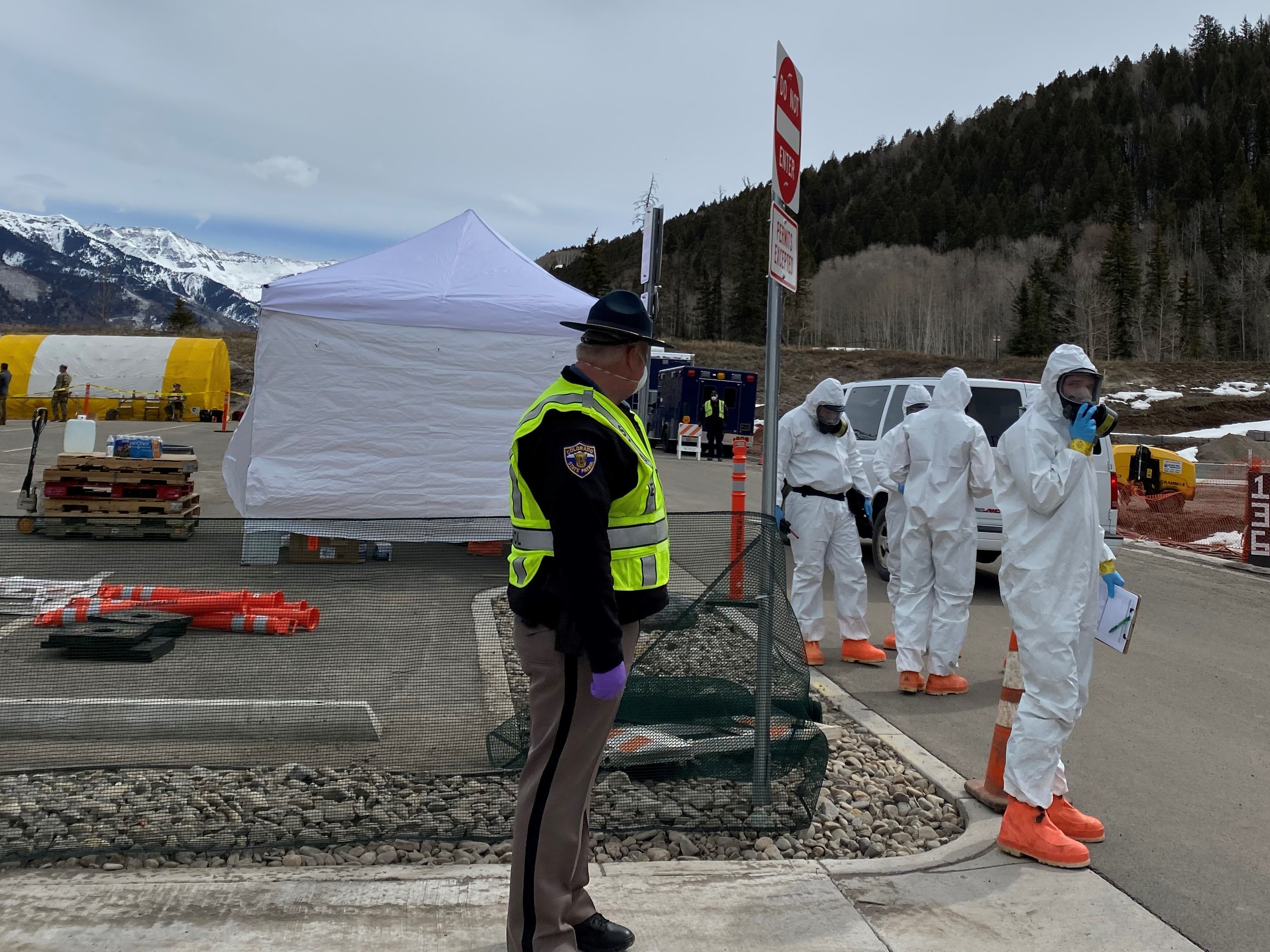
March 18: Colorado National Guard, CDPHE, and San Miguel County personnel assist at a drive-up testing center in Telluride, Colorado.

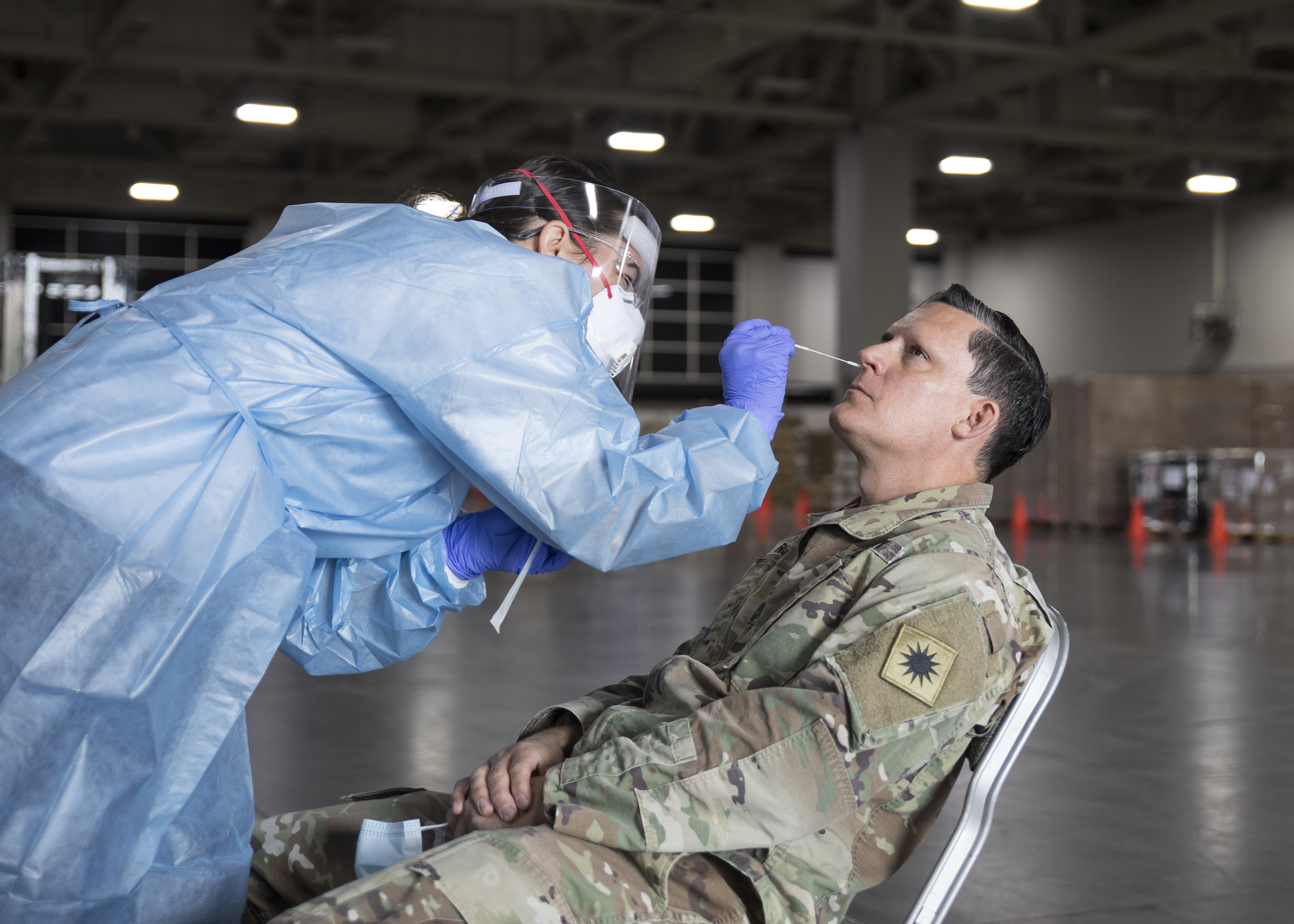
May 14: COVID-19 test conducted in Salt Lake City, Utah

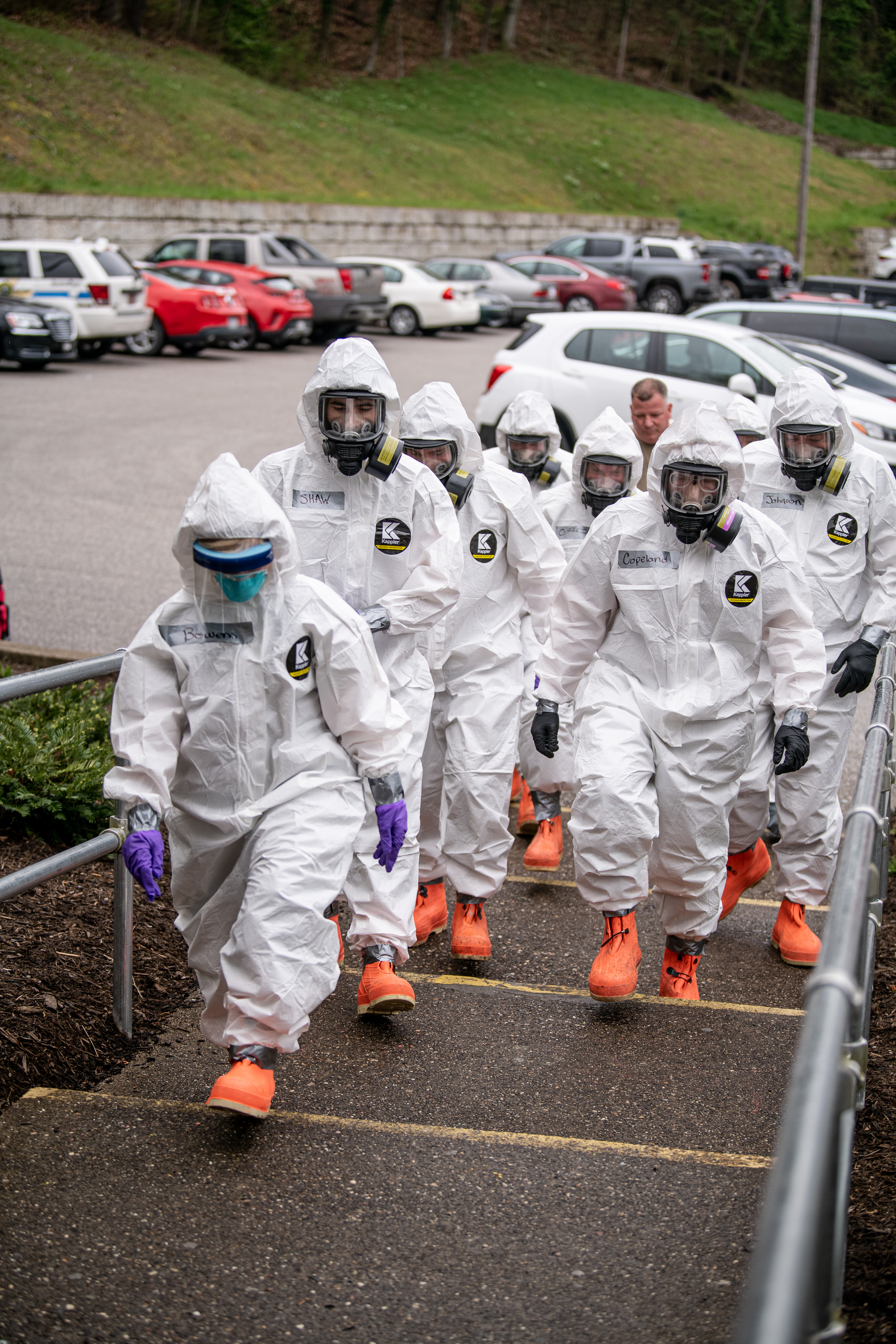
April 5: Testing team in Charleston, West Virginia responds to a confirmed case in a nursing home.

=== January 2020 ===
While the WHO opted to use an approach developed by Germany to test for SARS-CoV-2, the United States developed its own testing approach. The German testing method was made public on January 13, and the American testing method was made public on January 28. The WHO did not offer any test kits to the U.S. because the U.S. normally had the supplies to produce their own tests.

The United States had a slow start in widespread SARS-CoV-2 testing. From the start of the outbreak until early March 2020, the CDC gave restrictive guidelines on who should be eligible for COVID-19 testing. The initial criteria were (a) people who had recently traveled to certain countries, or (b) people with respiratory illness serious enough to require hospitalization, or (c) people who have been in contact with a person confirmed to have coronavirus.

=== February 2020 ===
In February, the U.S. CDC produced 160,000 SARS-CoV-2 tests, but soon it was discovered that many were defective and gave inaccurate readings. On February 19, the first U.S. patient with COVID-19 of unknown origin (a possible indication of community transmission) was hospitalized. The patient's test was delayed for four days because he had not qualified for a test under the initial federal testing criteria. By February 27, fewer than 4,000 tests had been conducted in the U.S. Although academic laboratories and hospitals had developed their own tests, they were not allowed to use them until February 29, when the FDA issued approvals for them and private companies.

From February 25, a group of researchers from the Seattle Flu Study defied federal and state officials to conduct their own tests, using samples already collected from flu study subjects who had not given permission for SARS-CoV-2 testing. They quickly found a teenager infected with SARS-CoV-2 of unknown origin, newly indicating that an outbreak had already been occurring in Washington for the past six weeks. State regulators stopped these researchers' testing on March 2, although the testing later resumed through the creation of the Seattle Coronavirus Assessment Network.

=== March 2020 ===
On March 5, the CDC relaxed the criteria to allow doctors discretion to decide who would be eligible for tests. Also on March 5, Vice President Mike Pence, the leader of the coronavirus response team, acknowledged that "we don't have enough tests" to meet the predicted future demand; this announcement came only three days after FDA commissioner Stephen Hahn committed to producing nearly a million tests by that week. Senator Chris Murphy of Connecticut and Representative Stephen Lynch of Massachusetts both noted that as of March 8 their states had not yet received the new test kits. By March 11, the U.S had tested fewer than 10,000 people. Doctor Anthony Fauci, head of the National Institute of Allergy and Infectious Diseases, acknowledged on March 12 it was "a failing" of the U.S. system that the demand for SARS-CoV-2 tests was not being met; Fauci later clarified that he believed the private sector should have been brought in sooner to address the shortfall.

By mid-March, the U.S. had tested 125 people per million of their population, which was lower than several other countries. The first COVID-19 cases in the U.S. and South Korea were identified at around the same time. Critics say the U.S. government has botched the approval and distribution of test kits, losing crucial time during the early weeks of the outbreak, with the result that the true number of cases in the United States was impossible to estimate with any reasonable accuracy.

By March 12, all fifty states were able to perform tests, with a doctor's approval, either from the CDC or local commercial lab. This was followed by the government announcing a series of measures intended to speed up testing. These measures included the appointment of Admiral Brett Giroir of the U.S. Public Health Service to oversee testing, funding for two companies developing rapid tests, and a hotline to help labs find needed supplies. The FDA also gave emergency authorization for New York to obtain an automated coronavirus testing machine.

In a March 13 press conference, the Trump administration announced a campaign to conduct tests in retail store parking lots across the country, but this was not widely implemented.

On March 13, drive-through testing in the U.S. began in New Rochelle, Westchester County, as New Rochelle was the U.S. town with the most diagnosed cases at that time. By March 22, drive-through testing had started in more than thirty states, although the Associated Press reported that "the system has been marked by inconsistencies, delays, and shortages", leading to many people waiting hours or days even though they showed symptoms and were recommended by a doctor to get a test. A lack of supplies had already forced the closure of drive-through testing in seven states.

By March 30, more than a million people had been tested, but not all the people showing symptoms were being tested.

=== April 2020 ===
During the weeks of April 6 and 13, the U.S. conducted about 150,000 tests per day, while experts recommended at least 500,000 per day prior to ending social distancing, with some recommending several times that level. Building up both testing and surveillance capacity are important to re-opening the economy; the purpose of social distancing is to buy time for such capacity-building.

On April 6, Federal health inspectors released a report stating that hospitals were experiencing shortages of test supplies, personal protective equipment (PPE), and other resources due to extended patient stays while awaiting test results.

The New York Times reported on April 26 that the U.S. still had yet to reach an adequate level of testing capacity needed to monitor and contain outbreaks. The capacity has been hampered by shortages of reagents, shortages of test kits components like nasal swabs, shortages of protective gear for health workers, limited laboratory workers and equipment, and the federal government's limited interventions to solve shortages, instead of leaving the issue to the free market, causing states and hospitals to compete with each other for supplies.

=== May to July 2020 ===
By early May, the U.S. was testing around 240,000 to 260,000 people per day, but this was still an inadequate level to contain the outbreak.

By June 24, thirteen of the forty-one federally funded community-based testing sites originally established in March were set to lose federal funding. They will remain under state and local control. Trump administration testing czar Admiral Giroir described the original community-based testing program as "antiquated". By June 26, 2020, Dr. Fauci said the administration was considering pooled testing as a way to speed up testing.

=== August 2020 to December 2020 ===
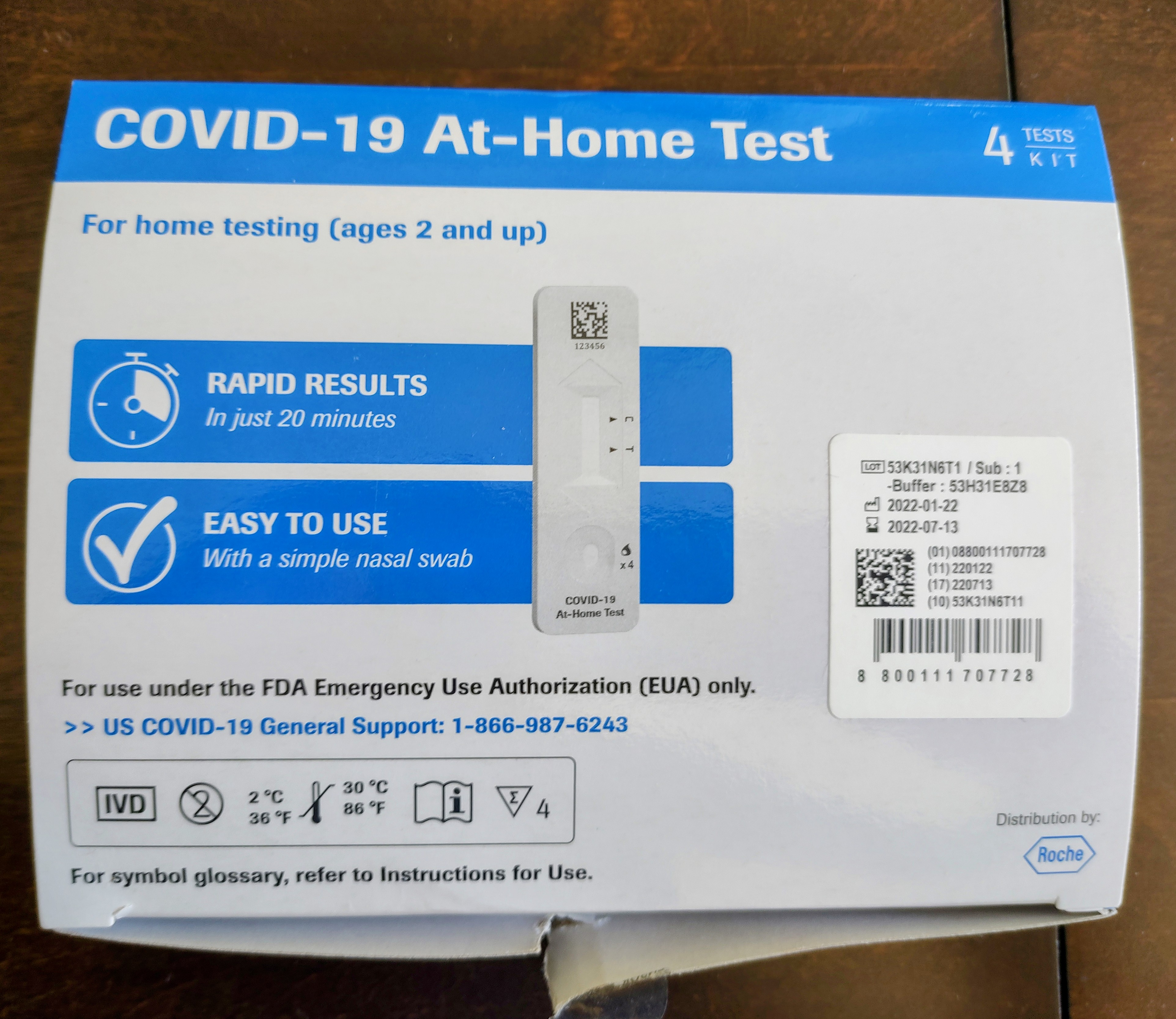
Free at-home COVID-19 test from U.S. Federal government.

By August, the overall ratio of positive to total tests was close to seven percent—well above the five percent the WHO considers to be the threshold for containment.

Trump has offered conflicting opinions about testing. In June 2020 Trump said several times that the U.S. would have fewer cases of coronavirus if it did less testing—"If we didn't do testing, we would have no cases"—and he told a June rally that he had ordered a slowdown in testing. The White House said he had been joking; he himself said "I don't kid" before later claiming he had said it sarcastically. Dr. Fauci clarified that the administration was ramping up testing, not slowing it down. In July he continued to suggest that "if we did half the testing we would have half the cases" and that a large number of reported cases was "fodder for the fake news". He has also said that he was "okay" with testing even though it "makes us look bad".

As of mid-August, according to Johns Hopkins University, the U.S. has been doing the most per-capita testing of any country, although Our World in Data shows other countries having higher rates—New Zealand, Israel, and the UK are examples. The U.S. test positivity rate was still beyond the WHO's recommended threshold for controlling the outbreak.

The New York Times reported that the Department of Health and Human Services and the administration wrote guidance released in August that was never subject to CDC scientific review, and thus took over the CDC imprimatur. Subtle but obvious errors were not CDC material such as "testing for Covid-19" (rather than for the virus that causes that illness).

In August 2020, the CDC lowered its recommendation for who should be tested, saying that people who have been exposed to the virus but are not showing symptoms "do not necessarily need a test". The previous recommendation had been that people exposed to the virus should be "quickly identified and tested" even if they are not showing symptoms, because asymptomatic people can still spread the virus. Experts expressed concern about the change, pointing out that about half of all community spread of the virus comes from people who are asymptomatic. It was later reported that the change had been due to pressure from high up in the Trump administration—"from the top down".

In September 2020, the Food and Drug Administration (FDA) approved emergency use authorization for the saliva test developed at the State University of New York Upstate Medical University. The Clarifi COVID-19 test is non-invasive and determines the presence or absence of SARS-CoV-2 viral RNA. In December 2020, Governor Cuomo congratulated SUNY Upstate Medical on #1 FDA Ranking Among COVID-19 saliva tests for detecting the virus in earliest stages.

In October 2020, the US diplomats and security officials raised a warning for Las Vegas against the use of Chinese test kits donated by the United Arab Emirates. In partnership with Group 42, Nevada was receiving donations of hundreds of thousands of test kits costing from between $15 million to $20 million, which raised concerns around patient privacy and test accuracy. Earlier, there were doubts that UAE's Group 42 could get access to US citizens through test data.

In December, the FDA authorized the use of a rapid testing kit developed by Brisbane, Australia-based Ellume Health. The test is available for purchase without a prescription for about $30 and can give results in about 20 minutes. The FDA approved the test for people with and without COVID symptoms.

== Types of testing ==
Tests are generally divided into two types. Viral testing can identify if a person is currently infected with SARS-CoV-2. Antibody testing can identify if a person has previously been exposed to the virus. As of August 2020, the FDA had granted Emergency Use Authorizations to over 200 tests for detecting current or past infection.
