= Anna Wald =

American epidemiologist and clinical virology researcher

Academic background
- Education: B.A, Comparative Religion, 1979, Wesleyan University; MD., 1985, Icahn School of Medicine at Mount Sinai; MPH., Epidemiology, 1994, University of Washington
- Thesis: Genital herpes in a family medicine clinic: demographic and sexual correlates of herpes simplex type-2 infections (1994)

Academic work
- Institutions: Fred Hutchinson Cancer Research Center; University of Washington School of Medicine

Anna Wald is an American epidemiologist and clinical virology researcher. She is the Head of the Division of Allergy and Infectious Diseases at the University of Washington School of Medicine (UWSOM).

== Education ==
Wald attended Wesleyan University for her Bachelor of Arts degree, where she was encouraged by a professor to apply to medical school. Wald agreed and graduated from Icahn School of Medicine at Mount Sinai with her MD degree in 1985. During her doctoral residency, she worked in inner-city hospitals and AIDS clinics. She moved to Seattle in 1989 and was hired by doctors Ann Collier and Lawrence Corey to work in the AIDS Clinical Trials Unit at the University of Washington School of Medicine (UWSOM).

== Career ==
Wald joined the faculty in the Division of Allergy and Infectious Diseases at UWSOM with a joint appointment in the Department of Epidemiology in 1995. While serving as the director of the UWSOM's Virology Research Clinic, she conducted studies on the epidemic of genital herpes. One of the studies she led was focused on how health care professionals can assist those with herpes by focusing on how people feel and the stigma surrounding the disease. In 2000, she received the Philip and Helen Fialkow Scholars Award given to junior faculty who made "outstanding achievements in medicine, research, teaching, clinical work, and academic citizenship." At the turn of the 21st century, Wald continued to lead studies on genital herpes, one of which found that condom use would prevent HSV infection. In order to reach this conclusion, Wald and colleagues studied more than 500 couples who had previously found the Herpes simplex virus vaccine did not work. Together, they found that the people who used condoms more than half the time were less likely to become infected with HSV-2. In 2003, Wald co-led a study with Corey and Zane Brown which confirmed that Caesarian sections during childbirth prevent transmission of herpes simplex. She also co-authored a study with an international team of researchers who found that taking a single daily dose of valacyclovir could reduce the transmission of genital herpes to uninfected partners. Wald began writing for the NEJM Journal Watch Women's Health as an associate editor in 2005. As a result of her research, Wald received the UWSOM's 2006 Award for Excellence in Mentoring Women and Minorities.

Wald was promoted to the ranks of Full Professor by 2007 and co-published a study titled Genital herpes with Rachna Gupta and Terri Warren in The Lancet. By 2013, Wald began leading clinical studies of GEN-003, an investigational, protein subunit vaccine that had the possibility to treat genital herpes. She later concluded that the antiviral pritelivir may be a treatment for patients with genital herpes. As a result of her research, Wald was the recipient of the 2014 Award for Scientific Advancement given by the Association for Women in Science (AWIS) and the 2015 Achievement Award from the American Sexually Transmitted Diseases Association.

On October 27, 2017, Wald was appointed Head of UWSOM's Division of Allergy and Infectious Diseases, replacing Wes Van Voorhis. In this role, she co-received an $11 million grant for a study titled Syphilis Vaccine to Protect Against Local and Disseminated Treponema pallidum Infection. She also received the 2019 Saul Horowitz, Jr. Memorial Award from her alma mater, the Icahn School of Medicine at Mount Sinai. During the 2019 coronavirus pandemic, Wald and Helen Y. Chu co-led international studies of remdesivir on its effects in severely ill patients.
