= Helen Chu =

Helen Chu may refer to:

- Chu Fong-chi (born 1948), Taiwanese politician
- Helen Y. Chu, American immunologist
