= Richard Oelze =

German painter

Richard Oelze (June 29, 1900 – November 26, 1980) was a German painter. He is classified as a surrealist.

== Life ==
He was born in Magdeburg. As of 1914, Oelze attended the School of Decorative Arts in Magdeburg, where he was trained as a lithographer until 1918. He learned nude drawing in evening classes. Among his teachers there were Richard Winckel and Kurt Tuch, as of 1918. From 1919 until 1921, he completed his studies at the same school as a Stipendiat (a person receiving a scholarship). Between 1921 and 1925, he was a student at the Bauhaus, at first in Weimar with Johannes Itten, and then in Dessau, where he received a special teaching post at the Bauhaus. From 1926 until 1929, he lived in Dresden, and participated in an exhibition of the "Dresdner Secession" there in 1929. He lived in Ascona in Switzerland from 1929 through 1930, and then in Berlin until 1932.

After a longer residence on Lake Garda, he stayed in Paris in the years from 1932 to 1936 and became acquainted with André Breton, Salvador Dalí, Paul Éluard and Max Ernst. During this time he also met Mina Loy, who was then working as a gallery representative for the Julien Levy Gallery (New York), whose posthumously published surrealist novel Insel depicts Oelze as the titular character. In 1936 his painting Tägliche Sorge and a drawing were included in the exhibition Fantastic Art, Surrealism and Dada at the Museum of Modern Art in New York. During 1936–1937, he again lived in Switzerland and in Italy. In 1938, he moved to Germany, where he settled in the artists' colony in Worpswede in 1939. From 1941 through 1945, he performed military service and was taken prisoner. After the war, he again went to Worpswede, where he worked until 1962, and then moved to Gut Posteholz near Hameln.

Oelze participated in documenta II in 1959 and in documenta III in 1964 in Kassel. In 1965, he became a member of the Academy of Arts, Berlin.

He died in Gut Posteholz on November 26, 1980.

== Work ==
His most important work may well be Die Erwartung (The Expectation, 1935/1936), which depicts a group of people staring into an empty landscape with their backs to the observer. This picture is judged to be a fundamental picture in the history of painting. However, he had already had great success with exhibitions in Amsterdam, London, Paris and New York.

Oelze was regarded as one of the most important painters of surrealism. His works are typified by a secretive representation of landscape and figural compositions, with rendition of details in the manner of the old masters.

Oelze had an important influence on the later French surrealist, Christian d'Orgeix.

== Honors ==
Oelze is the winner of the Max-Beckmann-Preis, received the Karl-Ernst-Osthaus-Preis of the city of Hagen, the Großen Kunstpreis (Great Art Prize) of the state of North Rhine Westphalia, the Lichtwark-Preis of the city of Hamburg and was awarded the Niedersachsenpreis in the category of culture in 1980.

The city of Magdeburg named a street for Oelze, the Oelzeweg, and there is a Richard-Oelze-Ring in Worpswede. In the village Gut Posteholz is a street crossing named Richard-Oelze-Platz.
