= Christian Schwarzenegger =

Swiss legal scientist and professor

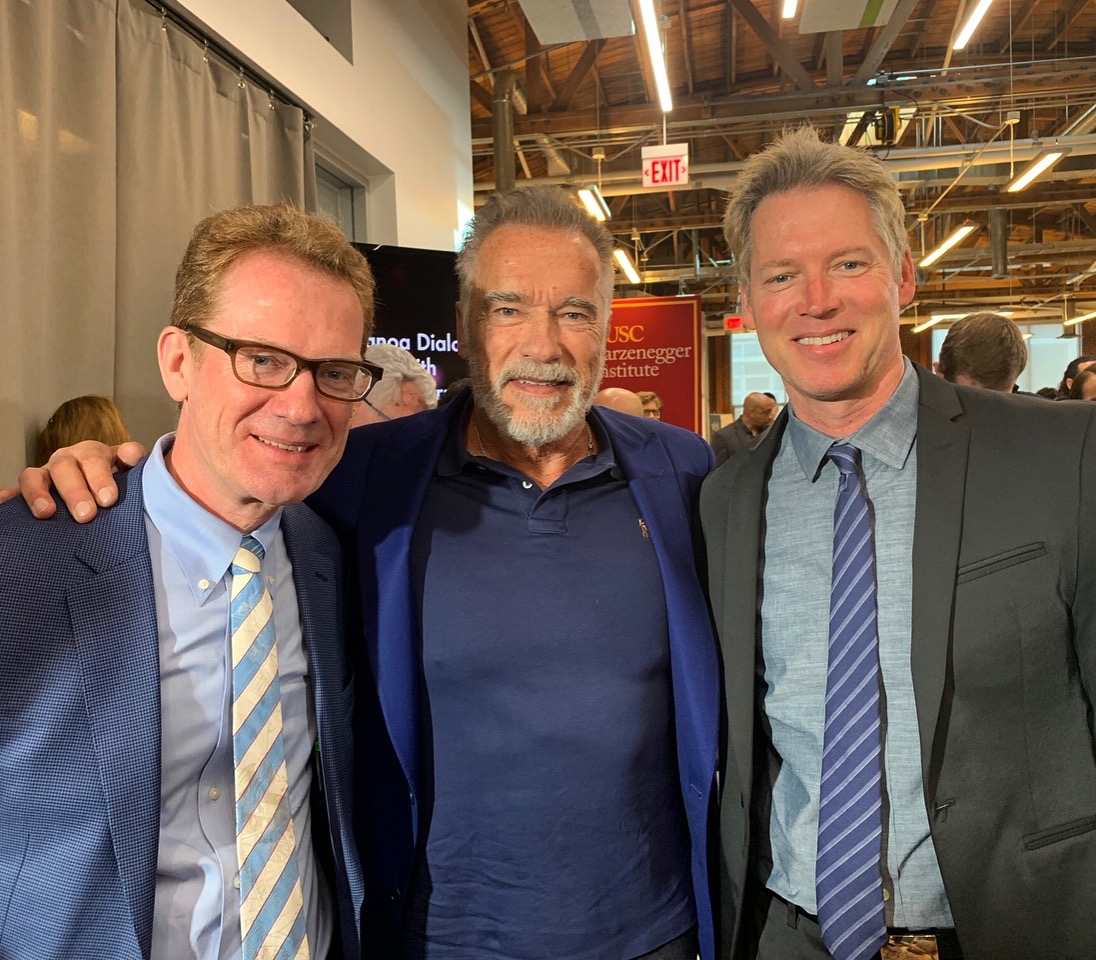
- Schwarzenegger in 2018
- Born: Christian Michael Schwarzenegger; 11 November 1959 (age 67); Zürich, Switzerland
- Occupations: Legal scientist; professor
- Children: 1
- Relatives: Arnold Schwarzenegger (cousin once removed)

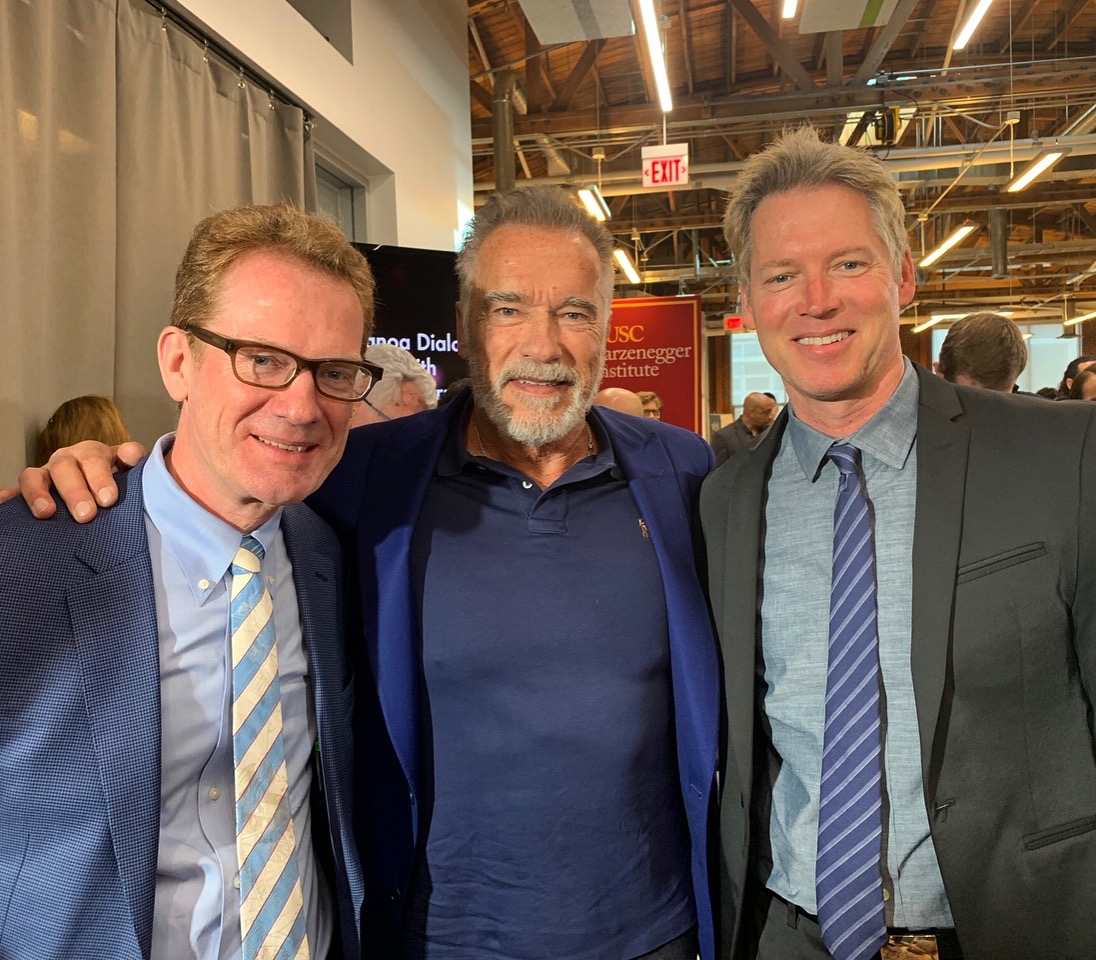
Christian Schwarzenegger (left), Arnold Schwarzenegger (middle) and Patrick Knapp-Schwarzenegger (right) at the Talanoa Dialogue on Sub-National Climate Financing, Los Angeles, 25 October 2018

Christian Michael Schwarzenegger (born 11 November 1959) is a Swiss academic lawyer and professor of criminal law, criminal procedure and criminology at the University of Zurich. He is known for his academic work in the field of cybercrime, criminal legal issues relating to the beginning and end of life, crime prevention and victimology, as well as his contributions to the promotion of academic exchange and mutual understanding between Japan and Switzerland.

== Early life and education ==
He studied law at the University of Zurich, where he graduated with a licentiate degree (lic.iur.). He then obtained his doctorate in 1992 with a dissertation on public attitudes to crime and crime control under the supervision of Günther Kaiser (de) and was admitted to the bar of the Canton of Schaffhausen in 1993.

== Career ==
From 1994 to 1999, Schwarzenegger taught as Assistant Professor of European law, comparative law, criminal law and criminology at Niigata University and Aichi University in Japan. In 1999 he returned to Zurich, where he was appointed one of the first assistant professors under a tenure-track model at the University of Zurich. Since 2010 he is full professor of criminal law, criminal procedure and criminology at the University of Zurich. From 2012 to 2014 he served as Dean of the Faculty of Law, and since 2014 he has been Vice President and member of the Executive Board of the University of Zurich. He is currently in charge of Faculty Affairs and Scientific Information. From 2014 to 2020, he was responsible for the University's international relations, for which he implemented the first internationalisation strategy and established strategic partnerships with Kyoto University and the University of Queensland.

A major reform project during his tenure was the reorganisation of the University of Zurich’s library system. Previously decentralised faculty collections were consolidated into a centralised structure, accompanied by the expansion of digital services and the promotion of Open Science and Open Access policies.

In 2018, the Schwarzenegger Institute signed an agreement to build a coalition with the Regions of Climate Action R20 (now: Catalytic) and University of Zurich to promote sustainable finance. The partners aim at transforming global markets in line with the Paris Climate Agreement based on scientific evidence.

After twelve years as Vice President, Schwarzenegger is scheduled to step down on 31 July 2026. From August 2026, he is to assume the position of Provost of Universitas 21, where he will be responsible for the strategic development and operational coordination of the international network of research-intensive universities.

== Honours and awards ==
On 3 November 2024, the Government of Japan conferred the Order of the Rising Sun, Gold Rays with Neck Ribbon to Schwarzenegger for his contributions to the academic exchange and mutual understanding between Japan and Switzerland.

== Selected publications in English ==
Susanne Fischer, Carola A. Huber, Matthias Furter, Lorenz Imhof, Romy Mahrer Imhof, Christian Schwarzenegger, Stephen J. Ziegler, Georg Bosshard: Reasons why people in Switzerland seek assisted suicide: the view of patients and physicians. Swiss Medical Weekly 139 (2009), 333-338

Schwarzenegger Christian, Manzoni Patrik, Studer David, Leanza Catia: Attitudes towards euthanasia and assisted suicide in Switzerland - Results of a national study, in: André Kuhn et al. (eds.), Kriminologie, Kriminalpolitik und Strafrecht aus internationaler Perspektive, Festschrift für Martin Killias zum 65. Geburtstag, Bern: Stämpfli Verlag, 425-446

Sarah Summers, Christian Schwarzenegger, Gian Ege, Finlay Young: The Emergence of EU Criminal Law. Cyber Crime and the Regulation of the Information Society. Oxford: Hart Publishing 2014

Patrik Manzoni, Christian Schwarzenegger: The influence of earlier parental violence on juvenile delinquency: The role of social bonds, self-control, delinquent peer association and moral values as mediators. European Journal on Criminal Policy and Research, 2018, 1-15

Gian Ege, Andreas Schloenhardt, Christian Schwarzenegger (eds.): Wildlife Trafficking: The illicit Trade in Wildlife, Animal Parts, and Derivatives. Berlin/Bern Carl Grossmann Verlag 2020

Gian Ege, Sena Hangartner, Christian Schwarzenegger, Kanako Takayama (eds.): Legal responses to doping. Zurich: Dike/Nomos Verlag 2023.
