= Heinrich Detering =

German educationist and writer

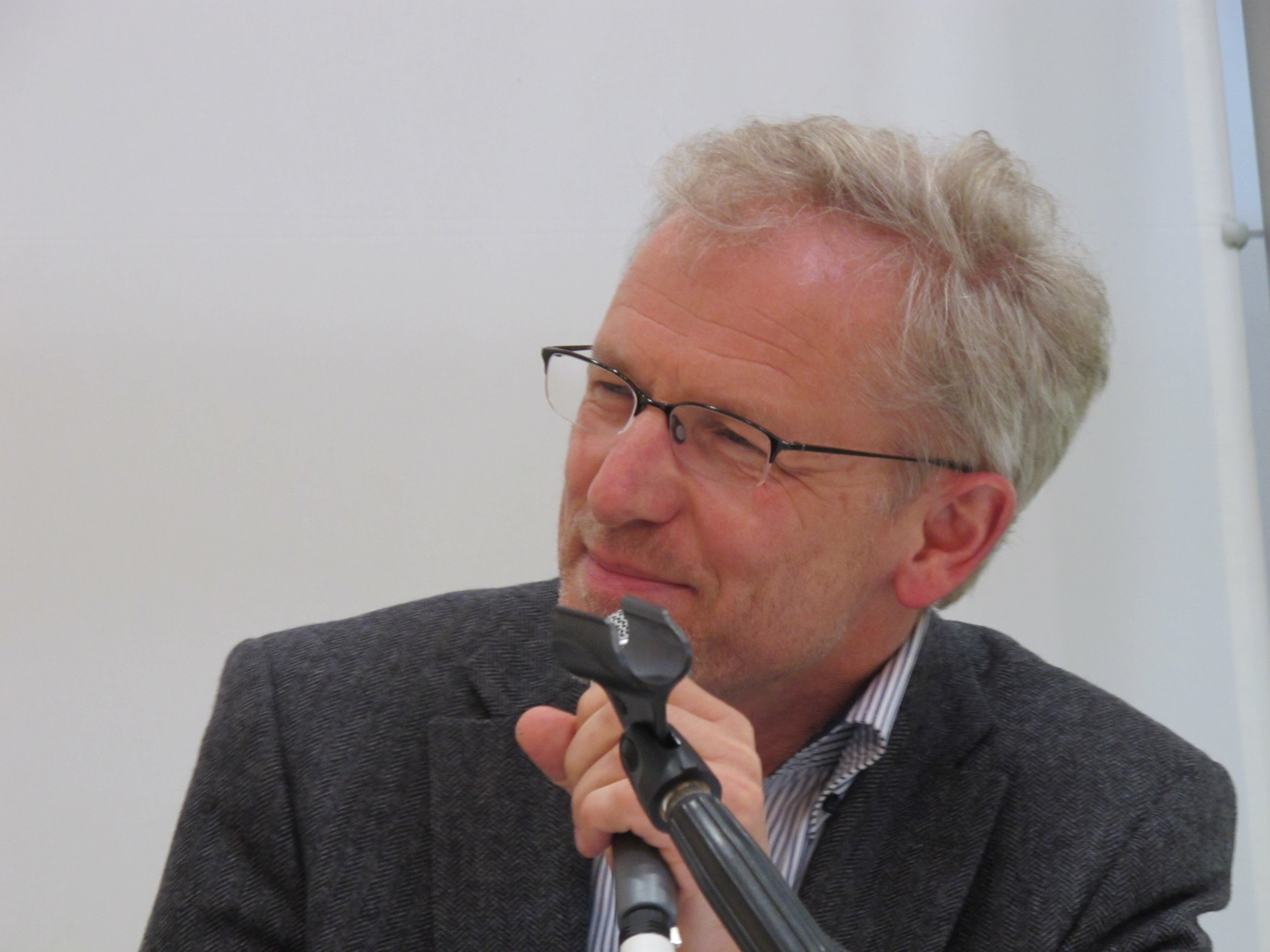
Detering in 2014

Heinrich Detering (born 1 November 1959 in Neumünster) is a poet, writer, and Professor in the fields of Literary Studies and Comparative literature Studies, mainly at the University of Göttingen. He was the president of the German Academy for Language and Literature from 2011 to 2017 and was awarded the German order of merit, the Pour le Mérite.

== Life and career ==
After his 1978 Abitur in Lemgo, Detering undertook studies in German philology, theology and philosophy at the University of Göttingen and Heidelberg University between 1979 and 1985. He subsequently pursued studies in Scandinavian studies at the Odense University between 1986 and 1988. Following his habilitation in 1993, he held a professorship in comparative literature at LMU Munich between 1994 and 1995. From 1995 to 2005, he taught Modern German and Modern Nordic Literatures at Kiel University. He subsequently relocated to Göttingen, where he remained until his retirement in 2023.

His research focuses on German and Scandinavian literature of the 18th to 20th centuries (e.g., Hans Christian Andersen, Theodor Storm, Thomas Mann) and on the song poetry of Bob Dylan.

Throughout his career, he has been a visiting professor and fellow, at many universities, including the University of California, Irvine, the University of Colorado Boulder, Washington University in St. Louis, and Huazhong University of Science and Technology.

Detering is a member of the Göttingen Academy of Sciences and Humanities, the Mainz Academy of Sciences and Literature and the Royal Danish Academy of Sciences and Letters. He was president of the German Academy for Language and Poetry (2011–2017) and the Theodor Storm Society (2003–2015).

=== Personal life ===
He is married since 1984 and has three children.

== Awards and honours ==
- 2003 Julius-Campe-Preis of Hoffmann und Campe (now part of the Ganske Publishing Group)
- 2007 Culture and Science Award of Kiel
- 2008 Honorary doctor title at the University of Aarhus
- 2009 Leibniz Prize
- 2011 Werner-Heisenberg-Medaille of the Alexander von Humboldt Foundation
- 2013 Order of the Dannebrog
- 2021 Gleim Literature Award by the Gleimhaus.
- 2022 Honorary doctor title at the Tartu University
- 2023 Pour le Mérite
- 2024 Lower Saxony State Prize

== Bibliography ==
=== Scientific publications ===
- In magischen Kreisen: Goethe und Lippe. 1984
- Das offene Geheimnis. Zur literarischen Produktivität eines Tabus von Winckelmann bis zu Thomas Mann. Wallstein, 1994, ISBN 3-89244-070-0
- Theodizee und Erzählverfahren. Vandenhoeck & Ruprecht, 1997, ISBN 3-525-20562-7
- With Heinz Ludwig Arnold: Grundzüge der Literaturwissenschaft, dtv, 1999, ISBN 3-423-30171-6
- Herkunftsorte. Boyens Media, 2001, ISBN 3-8042-1017-1
- Autorschaft. J.B. Metzler, 2002, ISBN 3-476-01850-4
- With Gerd Eversberg: Kunstautonomie und literarischer Markt. Konstellationen des Poetischen Realismus, Erich Schmidt Publishing, 2003, ISBN 3-503-06171-1
- Frauen, Juden, Literaten. Eine Denkfigur beim jungen Thomas Mann. Fischer, 2005, ISBN 3-10-014203-9
- Andersen und andere. Kleine dänisch-deutsche Kulturgeschichte Kiels. Boyens, 2005, ISBN 3-8042-1159-3
- Bob Dylan. Reclam, 2007, ISBN 978-3-15-018432-5
- Bertolt Brecht und Lao-tse. Wallstein Publishing, 2008, ISBN 978-3-8353-0266-2
- Vom Zählen der Silben. Über das lyrische Handwerk: Münchner Reden zur Poesie, Lyrik Kabinett, 2009. ISBN 978-3-938776-22-3
- Der Antichrist und der Gekreuzigte. Friedrich Nietzsches letzte Texte. Wallstein, 2010, ISBN 978-3-8353-0635-6
- Kindheitsspuren. Theodor Storm und das Ende der Romantik. Boyens, 2011, ISBN 978-3-8042-1333-3
- Hans Christian Andersen. Deutscher Kunstverlag, 2011, ISBN 978-3-422-07041-7
- Thomas Manns amerikanische Religion. Theologie, Politik und Literatur im kalifornischen Exil. Fischer, 2012, ISBN 978-3-10-014204-7
- Die Stimmen aus der Unterwelt. Bob Dylans Mysterienspiele. C. H. Beck, 2016, ISBN 978-3-406-68876-8
- Planetenwellen. Gedichte und Prosa/Bob Dylan, übersetzt und kommentiert von Heinrich Detering. Hoffmann und Campe, 2017, ISBN 978-3-455-00118-1
- Holzfrevel und Heilsverlust. Die ökologische Dichtung der Annette von Droste-Hülshoff. Wallstein, 2020, ISBN 978-3-8353-3759-6
- Menschen im Weltgarten. Die Entdeckung der Ökologie in der Literatur von Haller bis Humboldt. Wallstein, 2020, ISBN 978-3-8353-3626-1
- With Lisa Kunze and Katrin Wellnitz: Günter Grass als Buchkünstler. Steidl, 2022, ISBN 978-3-96999-117-6

=== Poems ===
- Schwebstoffe. Gedichte. Wallstein, 2004, ISBN 3-89244-787-X
- Wrist. Gedichte. Wallstein, 2009, ISBN 978-3-8353-0519-9
- Old Glory. Gedichte. Wallstein, 2012, ISBN 978-3-8353-1167-1
- Wundertiere. Gedichte. Wallstein, 2015, ISBN 978-3-8353-1598-3
- Untertauchen. Gedichte. Wallstein, 2019, ISBN 978-3-8353-3444-1
- An der Nachtwand. Gedichte. Wallstein, 2023, ISBN 978-3-8353-5352-7
