= Lajos Rovátkay =

Hungarian-born German harpsichordist and musicologist (1933–2026)

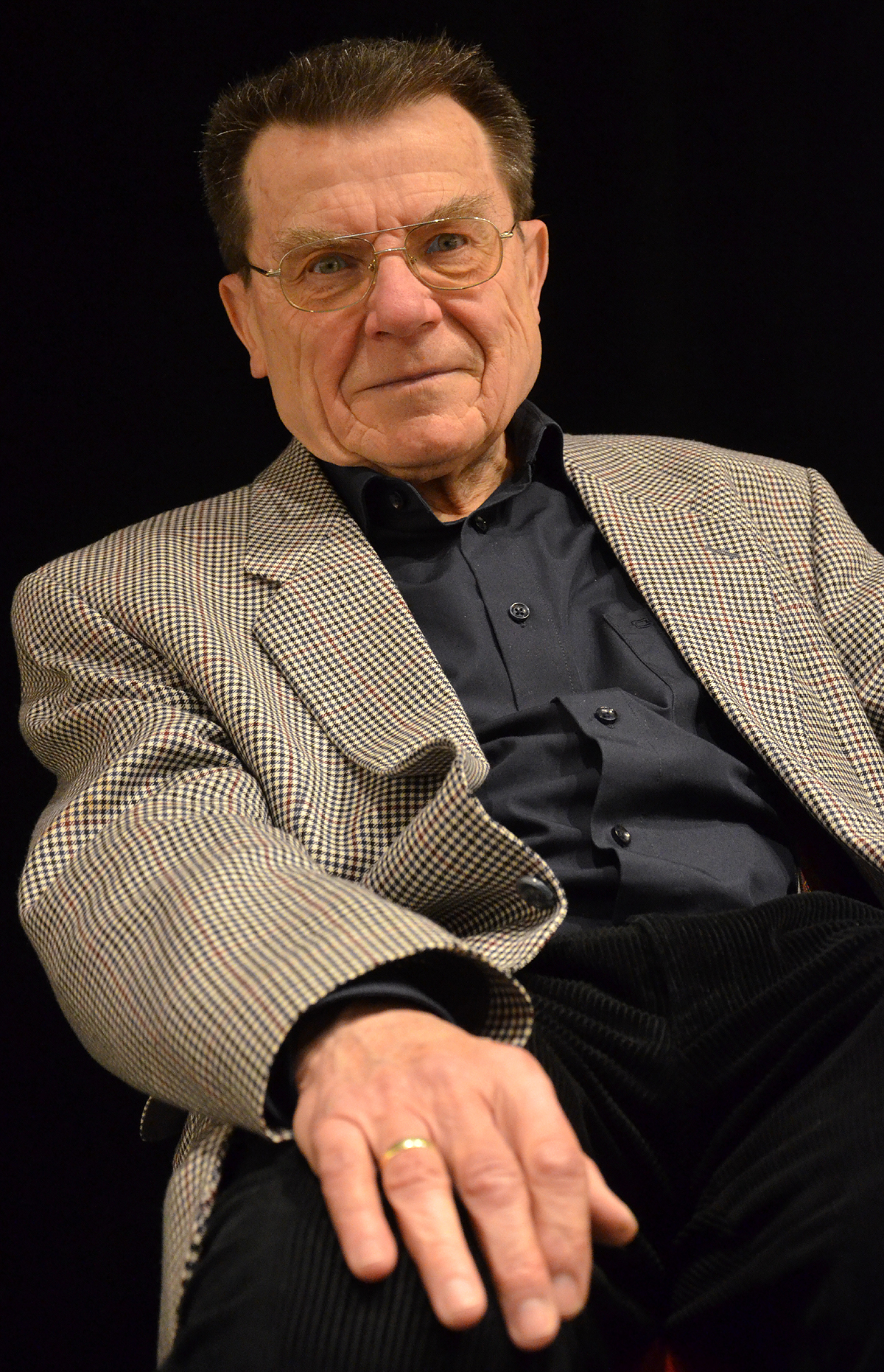
- Rovátkay in 2015
- Born: 15 September 1933; Budapest, Hungary
- Died: 2 January 2026 (aged 92); Hanover, Lower Saxony, Germany
- Occupations: Harpsichordist, musicologist

Lajos Rovátkay (15 September 1933 – 2 January 2026) was a Hungarian-born German harpsichordist and musicologist. He was a recipient of the Lower Saxony State Prize (1992).

Rovátkay died on 2 January 2026 in Hanover, at the age of 92.
