= Nextstrain =

Website for tracking viral evolution

- Formation: 2015; 11 years ago
- Locations: Seattle, United States; Basel, Switzerland
- Fields: Bioinformatics; Viral phylodynamics; Open-source software
- Key people: Trevor Bedford; Richard Neher; Emma Hodcroft
- Awards: Open Science Prize; Webby Award
- Website: https://nextstrain.org

Nextstrain is a collaboration between researchers in Seattle, United States and Basel, Switzerland which provides a collection of open-source tools for visualising the genetics behind the spread of viral outbreaks.

Its aim is to support public health measures and surveillance by facilitating understanding of the spread and evolution of pathogens. The Nextstrain platform was begun in 2015. Code developed by Nextstrain is made publicly available, via, for example GitHub.com and its data is available and viewable in accessible form via the pages at the website.

== Applications ==
According to their website, the Nextstrain team maintains an up-to-date genomic analysis of the following pathogens:

- Avian influenza
  - HPAI (North America)
- Dengue
- Ebola (Global and DRC incl. 2013-16)
- Enterovirus D68
- HIV
- Human metapneumovirus
- Lassa fever
- Measles
- Monkeypox virus (DRC)
- Mumps
- Rabies virus
- Respiratory syncytial virus
- Rubella virus
- SARS-CoV-2 (also: lineage/clade % forecasts)
- Seasonal influenza
- Tuberculosis
- West Nile virus (Americas)
- Yellow fever
- Yersinia pestis
- Zika

The above list is based on the "featured analyses" list on the main page. A complete list of analyses maintained by the Nextstrain team can be found in "core pathogens". Additional analyses can be found in the "groups" and "community" links.

=== COVID-19 pandemic ===
Nextstrain and its results were widely quoted during the COVID-19 pandemic.

== Awards ==
In March 2017, Nextstrain won the inaugural Open Science Prize, an initiative of the National Institutes of Health, in collaboration with the Wellcome Trust and the Howard Hughes Medical Institute (HHMI).

In May 2020, Nextstrain and Trevor Bedford (associate professor, Fred Hutchinson Cancer Research Center) received a Webby Special Achievement Award for the web tool.

== See also ==
- INSDC
- GISAID
- PANGOLIN
- List of COVID-19 simulation models
