= Georg Klein (writer) =

German novelist

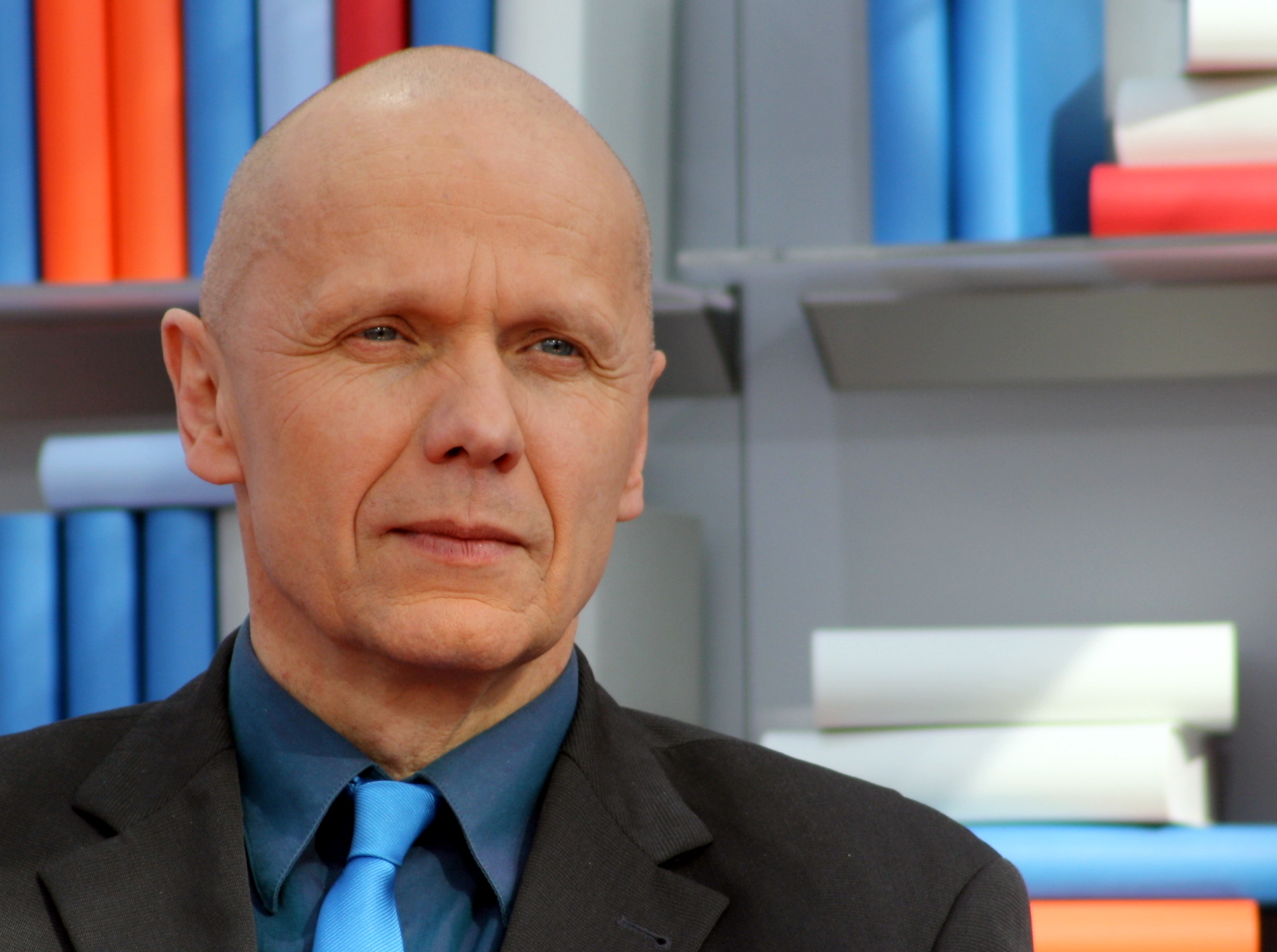
Georg Klein at the Leipzig Book Fair 2010

Georg Klein (born 1953 in Augsburg) is a German novelist. He lives in Ditzumerverlaat (Bunde), Lower Saxony. His wife Katrin de Vries is also a writer. In September 2012 he was keynote speaker at the British Council sponsored Edinburgh World Writers' Conference in Berlin. Having worked for many years as a ghost-writer Klein was discovered in 2001 with his detective story Barbar Rosa.

== Awards ==
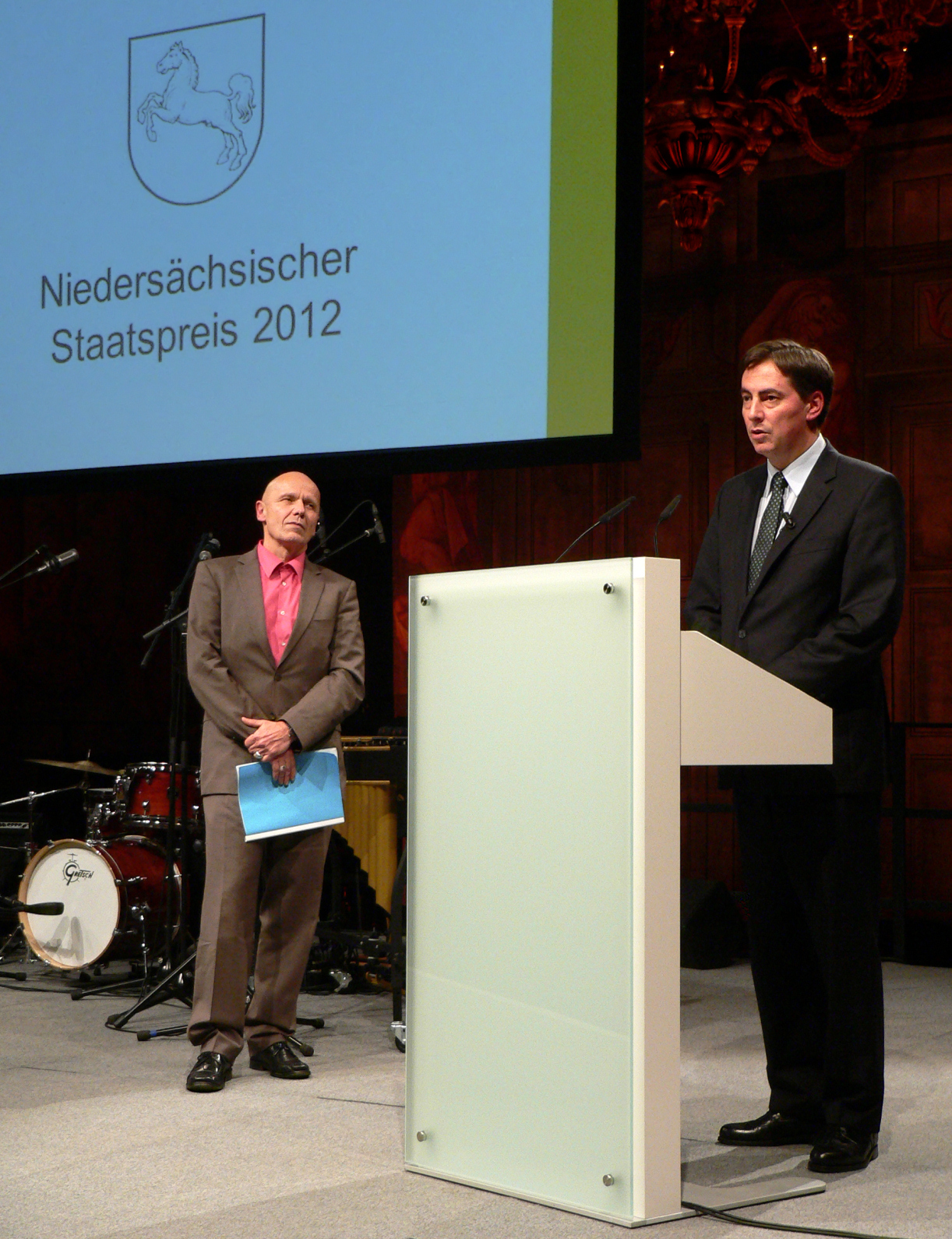
Klein (left) awarded with the Lower Saxony State Prize 2012 from Ministerpräsident David McAllister

- 1999: Brothers Grimm Prize of the City of Hanau
- 2000: Ingeborg Bachmann Prize
- 2010: Leipzig Book Fair Prize for Fiction
- 2012: Lower Saxony State Prize
- 2022: Großer Preis des Deutschen Literaturfonds

== Works ==
- Libidissi. novel. Fest, Berlin 1998. ISBN 3-8286-0072-7
- Anrufung des blinden Fisches. short stories. Fest, Berlin 1999. ISBN 3-8286-0087-5
- Barbar Rosa. Eine Detektivgeschichte. Fest, Berlin 2001. ISBN 3-8286-0134-0
- Von den Deutschen. short stories. Rowohlt, Reinbek bei Hamburg 2002. ISBN 3-498-03513-4
- Die Sonne scheint uns. novel. Rowohlt, Reinbek bei Hamburg 2004. ISBN 3-498-03522-3
- Sünde Güte Blitz. novel. Rowohlt, Reinbek bei Hamburg 2007. ISBN 978-3-498-03532-7
- Schlimme schlimme Medien. 2-CD-Set. supposé, Köln 2007. ISBN 978-3-932513-77-0
- Nacht mit dem Schandwerker. In: Ullmaier, Johannes (2007). Schicht! : Arbeitsreportagen für die Endzeit (in German). Frankfurt am Main: Suhrkamp. ISBN 978-3-518-12508-3. OCLC 180750650. pp. 238–258
- Roman unserer Kindheit. novel. Rowohlt, Reinbek bei Hamburg 2010. ISBN 978-3-498-03533-4
- Die Logik der Süße. short stories. Rowohlt, Reinbek bei Hamburg 2010. ISBN 978-3-498-03555-6
- Schund & Segen 77 Abverlangte Texte. Rowohlt, Reinbek bei Hamburg 2013, ISBN 978-3-498-03566-2
- Die Zukunft des Mars. novel. Rowohlt, Reinbek bei Hamburg 2013, ISBN 978-3-498-03534-1
- Miakro. novel. Rowohlt, Reinbek bei Hamburg 2018, ISBN 978-3-498-03410-8
