= 3MT Venue =

Entertainment venue in Manchester, England

Coordinates: 53.4824°N 2.2363°W

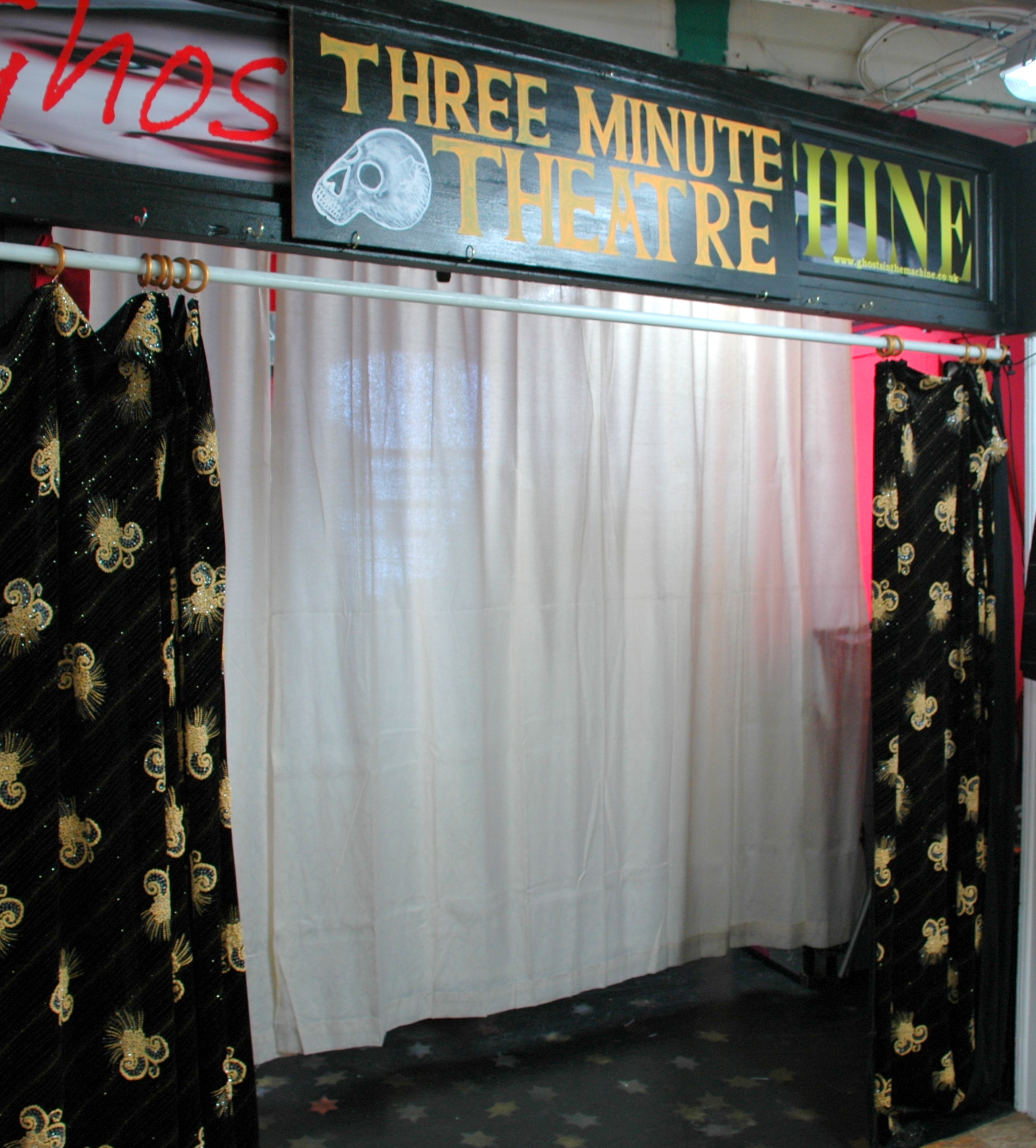
The First Three Minute Theatre Show 16 October 2010

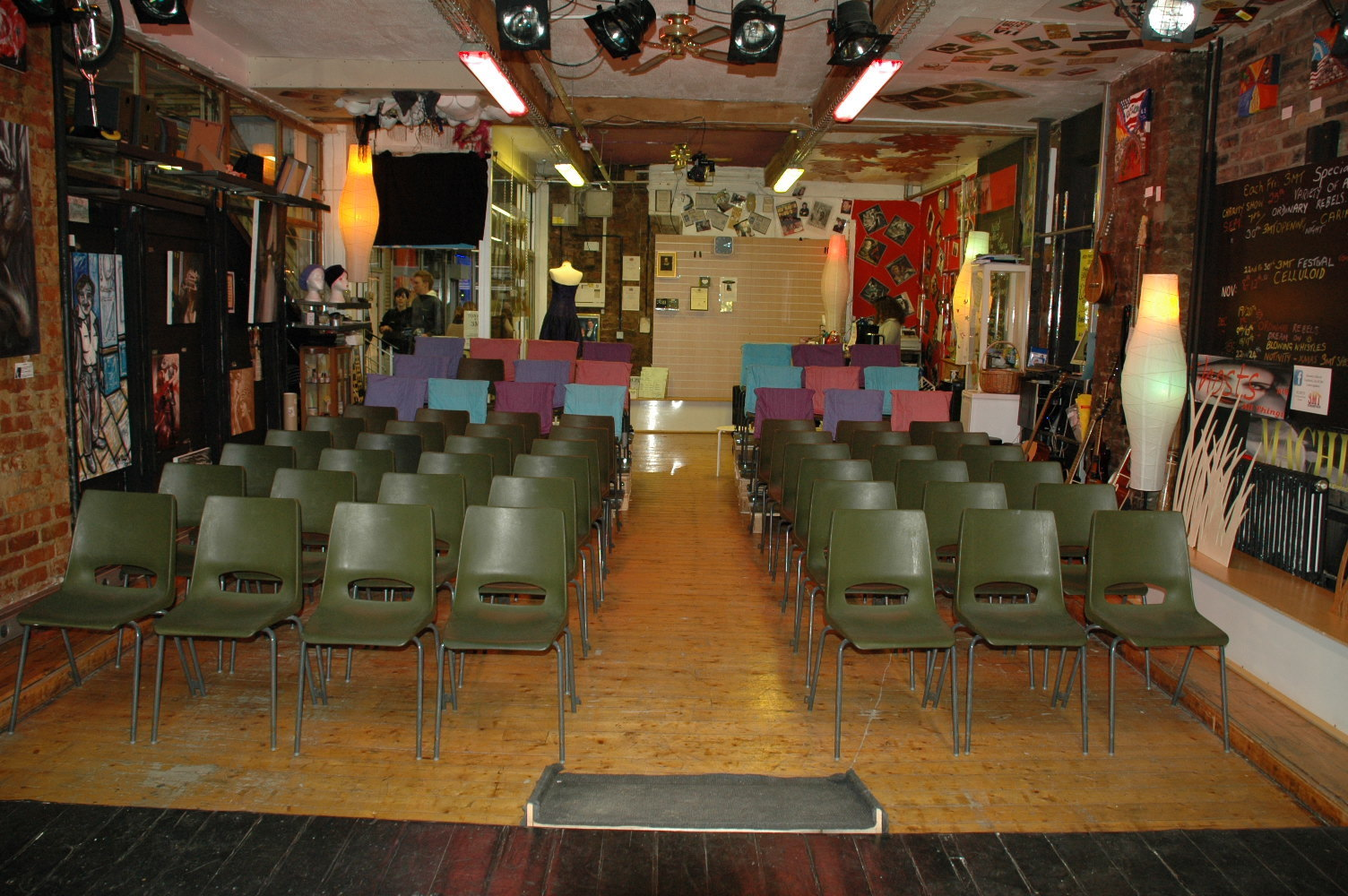
3MT from stage October 2011

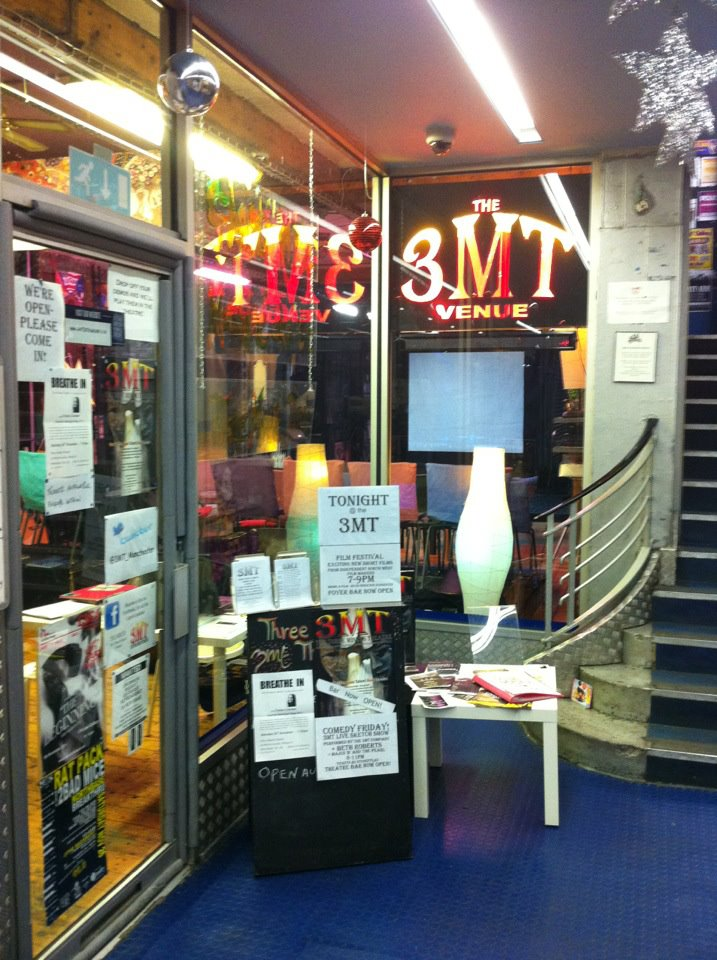
Entrance to 3MT 2012

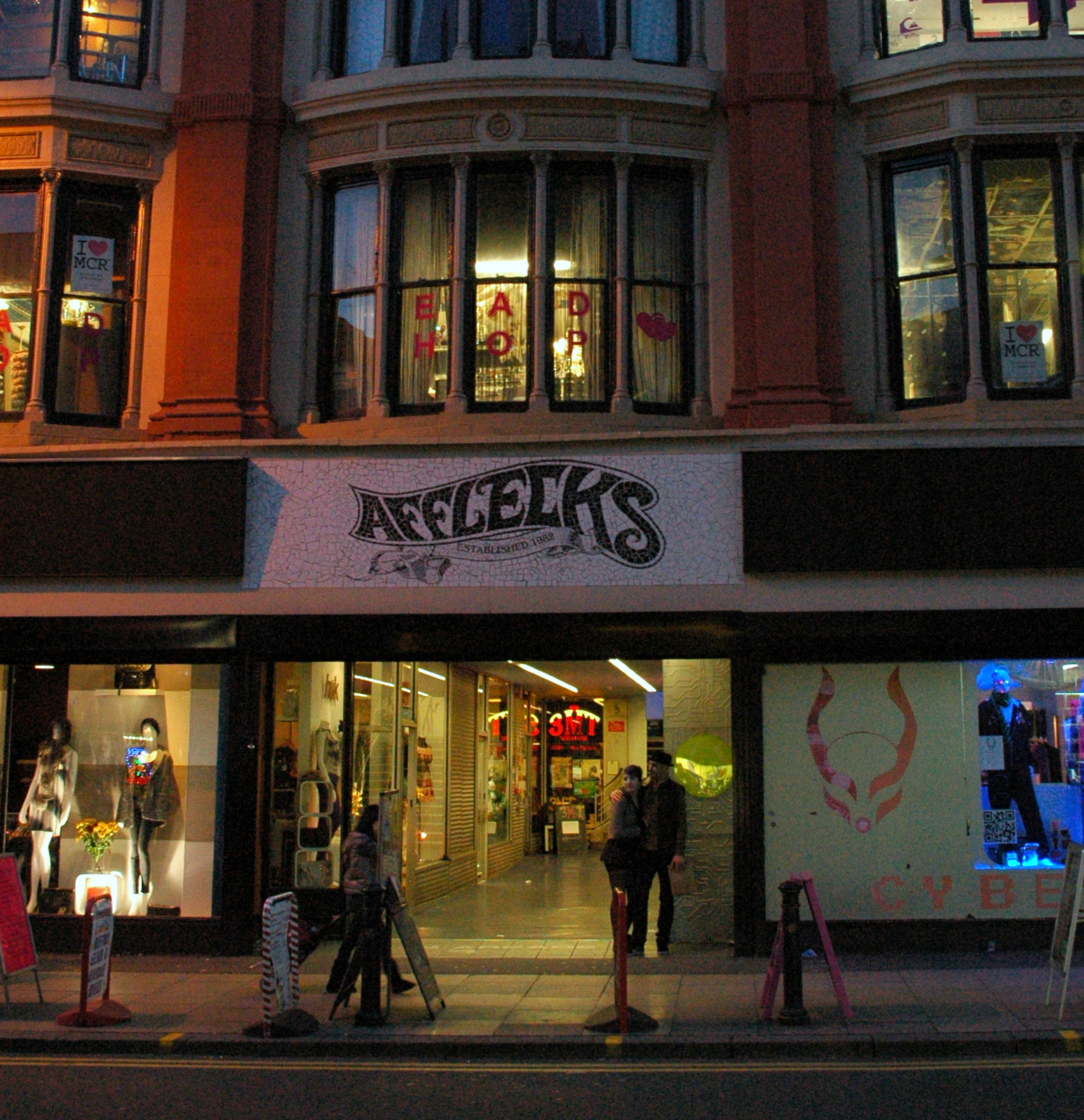

3MT Venue, also known just as 3MT, is the Three Minute Theatre in Afflecks Arcade, Oldham Street, Manchester, England. It was a 70-seat independent theatre, cinema and music venue established in 2010 it closed in July 2019. Its first incarnation was on the third floor of the Afflecks building on 16 October 2010 inside the Ghosts in the Machine unit. Its repertoire concentrated on new drama, poetry and comedy. It had a licensed bar. In 2012 it was the host of the first Afflecks Fringe Festival.
