= Erwin Neher =

German biophysicist and Nobel laureate

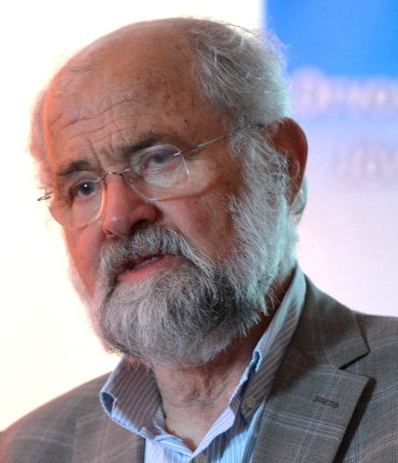
- Erwin Neher in June 2015
- Born: 20 March 1944 (age 82); Landsberg am Lech, Bavaria, Germany
- Education: Technical University of Munich; University of Wisconsin–Madison
- Known for: patch clamp
- Awards: W. Alden Spencer Award (1983); Nobel Prize in Physiology or Medicine (1991); ForMemRS (1994); Gottfried Wilhelm Leibniz Prize (1987); Louisa Gross Horwitz Prize (1986)
- Scientific career
- Fields: Biophysics
- Workplaces: University of Göttingen; University of Wisconsin–Madison; Yale University; Max Planck Institute for Biophysical Chemistry
- Academic advisors: Charles F. Stevens
- Website: www.mpg.de/323786/biophysikalische_chemie_wissM6

Erwin Neher (German pronunciation: [ˈɛʁviːn ˈneːɐ]; /ˈneɪər/; born 20 March 1944) is a German biophysicist, specializing in the field of cell physiology. For significant contribution in the field, in 1991 he was awarded, along with Bert Sakmann, the Nobel Prize in Physiology or Medicine for "their discoveries concerning the function of single ion channels in cells".

== Early life and education ==
Neher was born in Landsberg am Lech, Upper Bavaria, the son of Elisabeth (née Pfeiffer), a teacher, and Franz Xaver Neher, an executive at a dairy company. He studied physics at the Technical University of Munich from 1963 to 1966.

In 1966, he was awarded a Fulbright Scholarship to study in the US. He spent a year at the University of Wisconsin–Madison, and earned a master's degree in biophysics. While at the laboratory of the Max-Planck-Institute for Biophysical Chemistry he met fellow scientist Eva-Maria Neher (born Ruhr), whom he married in 1978 and subsequently the couple had five children – Richard, Benjamin, Carola, Sigmund, and Margret.

In 2003 Neher was one of 22 Nobel Laureates who signed the Humanist Manifesto.

== Career ==
In 1986, he was awarded the Louisa Gross Horwitz Prize from Columbia University together with Bert Sakmann. In 1987, he received the Gottfried Wilhelm Leibniz Prize of the Deutsche Forschungsgemeinschaft, which is the highest honour awarded in German research. Along with Bert Sakmann, he was awarded the Nobel Prize in Physiology or Medicine in 1991 for "their discoveries concerning the function of single ion channels in cells". Neher and Sakmann were the first to record the currents of single ion channels on a live cell (they were first recorded using the lipid bilayer method) through their development of the patch-clamp technique. The methodology has been further developed with the strong encouragement of Charles F. Stevens in his laboratory at Yale University.

Since 1983, he became a director at the Max Planck Institute for Biophysical Chemistry in Göttingen and led the Department for Membrane Biophysics. He turned into an emeritus director of the Institute since 2011. He is also a professor emeritus at the University of Göttingen and used to be co-chair of the Bernstein Center for Computational Neuroscience Göttingen.

== Honors and awards ==
- Nobel Prize in Physiology or Medicine (1991, jointly with Bert Sakmann)
- Fellow of the Royal Society (1994)
- Ralph W. Gerard Prize in Neuroscience (1991)
- Gottfried Wilhelm Leibniz Prize (1987)
- Louisa Gross Horwitz Prize (Columbia University) (1986 jointly with Bert Sakmann)
- W. Alden Spencer Award (Columbia University) (1983 jointly with Bert Sakmann)

Neher holds honorary degrees from:

- University of Alicante, Spain, 1993
- University of Wisconsin, Madison, Wisconsin, USA, 1993
- Technical University of Munich, FRG, 1994
- University of Madrid, Spain, 1994
- Huazhong University of Sciences & Technology, Wuhan, PR China, 1994
- University of Bahía Blanca, Argentina, 1995
- University of Rome, Italy, 1996
- Hebrew University of Jerusalem, Israel, 1999
- University of Pavia, 2000
- Oxford University, 2025

Neher was elected a Foreign Member of the Royal Society (ForMemRS) in 1994.
