= Hugo Dittberner =

German writer (born 1944)

- Born: 16 November 1944 (age 81); Gieboldehausen, Nazi Germany
- Occupation: Writer

Hugo Dittberner (born 16 November 1944 in Gieboldehausen) is a German writer.

== Early years ==
Hugo Dittberner is the son of an accountant. Between 1956 and 1965 Dittberner attended a boarding school in Bad Nenndorf. After successfully completing his schooling he moved on to Göttingen University where he studied German literature and linguistics, history and philosophy, graduating in 1972. He taught briefly at Karlsruhe University before settling to the life of a freelance writer.

== Middle years ==
Dittberner has produced a number of volumes of poetry along with numerous novels and short stories. His colloquial poetry style marked him as part of the "New Subjectivity" movement in the 1970s. Both his poetry and his prose works deal with issues of daily life, frequently reflecting the interpersonal problems and relationship issues affecting members of the "'68 generation"

Between 1974 and 2000 Dittberner was a member of the Verband deutscher Schriftsteller (VS/ German Writers' Union). He is a member of the German section of PEN International and of the Mainz based Akademie der Wissenschaften und der Literatur.

In 1979 he was the recipient of the Award of the Cultural Committee of German Industry. This was followed in 1981 by a Villa Massimo stipendium.

In 1984 he won the Niedersachsenpreis for journalism and in 1994 the Berlin Literature prize. In 1997 Dittberner was awarded a Worpswede Artistic Stipendium, and in 2001 a Cultural Stipendium from the Cultural Centre in Edenkoben. Further awards and prizes followed.

== Official recognition ==
In 2005 the state government honoured him with the Order of Merit

== Works ==
Hugo Dittberner published works
- Donnervogel, Göttingen 1973 (together with Jens Wilke)
- Pasjes, Bergen, Holland 1973
- Rutschbahn, Kassel 1973
- Die frühen Romane Heinrich Manns, Göttingen 1974
- Heinrich Mann, Frankfurt am Main 1974
- Das Internat, Darmstadt [u. a.] 1974
- Der Biß ins Gras, Köln 1976
- Kurzurlaub, Darmstadt [u. a.] 1976
- Draußen im Dorf, Reinbek bei Hamburg 1978
- Jacobs Sieg, Reinbek bei Hamburg 1979
- Ruhe hinter Gardinen, Reinbek bei Hamburg 1980
- Die gebratenen Tauben, Reinbek bei Hamburg 1981
- Drei Tage Unordnung, Bielefeld 1983
- Der Tisch unter den Wolken, Göttingen 1986
- Wie man Provinzen erobert, Reinbek bei Hamburg 1986
- Die Wörter, der Wind, Bergen, Holland 1988
- Geschichte einiger Leser, Zürich 1990
- Im Lehm, Bergen, Holland 1992
- Das letzte fliegende Weiß, Bergen 1992
- Über Wohltäter, Zürich 1992
- Das letzte fliegende Weiß, Cologne 1994
- Wolken und Vögel und Menschentränen, Göttingen 1995
- Was ich sagen könnte, Stuttgart 1996
- Wasser-Elegien, zu Klampen Verlag, Springe 1997
- Arche nova, Göttingen 1998
- Versuch zu rühmen, Darmstadt 1999
- Vor den Pferdeweiden, Bergen, Holland 1999
- Morgenübungen, München 2000
- Das älteste Testament, zu Klampen Verlag, Springe 2007
- Das Seevokabularium. Wallstein-Verlag, Göttingen 2010, ISBN 978-3-8353-0631-8
