= Universitas 21 =

Global network of research-intensive universities

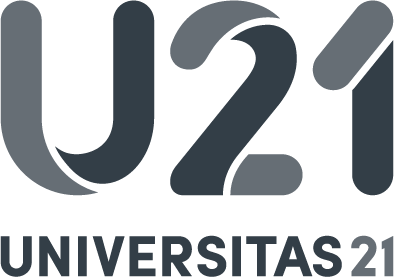
- Formation: 1997
- Type: Education and research
- Headquarters: Birmingham, United Kingdom
- Region served: Global
- Provost: Christian Schwarzenegger
- Website: Universitas 21

Universitas 21 (U21) is an international network of research-intensive universities. Founded in Melbourne, Australia, in 1997, it comprises 31 member universities across six continents as of November 2026. The network supports collaboration in research and teaching, international exchanges for students and university staff, and cooperation between university leaders. Its activities include researcher development, international student programmes and the exchange of approaches to university teaching and management.

== History ==
Universitas 21 was established at a meeting of university leaders in Melbourne in 1997. The initiative originated with Alan Gilbert, then vice-chancellor of the University of Melbourne. Its early activities included international exchanges and cooperation in research and education. The network subsequently developed summer schools, conferences for early-career researchers and online learning opportunities. In 2019, it introduced RISE (Real Impact on Society and Environment), a showcase for student projects in sustainability and social innovation.

== Aims and organisation ==
U21 provides a forum for its member universities to exchange knowledge and experience and develop joint initiatives. Its stated priorities are research, education and students' experiences of university life and learning. Its principles include the internationalisation of higher education, sustainable development and the development of leadership skills among students and university staff.

The network's strategic direction involves the leaders of its member universities. A chair and an executive committee drawn from university presidents oversee its activities. As of November 2026, the chair is David Garza of Tecnológico de Monterrey. The provost is responsible for operational leadership and strategic development. Christian Schwarzenegger of the University of Zurich took up the role on 1 August 2026. The secretariat is based at the University of Birmingham and supports programme delivery, events and communications.

Each member university nominates a senior leader to act as a link with the network. U21 officers coordinate participation within their institutions, while steering groups oversee activities in research, education and student experience.

== Activities and programmes ==
=== Research and researcher development ===
U21 supports international networking among doctoral candidates and researchers at different career stages. Its activities include workshops, the development of collaborative research projects and the exchange of approaches to research integrity. Through a partnership with the African Research Universities Alliance (ARUA), it funded five projects led by early-career researchers on sustainability-related topics, including water management, renewable energy and adaptation to environmental change.

The U21 Three Minute Thesis (3MT) competition asks doctoral researchers to explain their research to a non-specialist audience in three minutes. Member universities nominate participants for an international online final.

=== Education and student programmes ===
Groups of academic staff and university leaders exchange approaches to teaching, international learning, student mobility and graduate employability. The project Transforming Assessment in a New Era examined institutional responses to generative artificial intelligence in teaching, learning and assessment. It concluded in July 2025 with the publication of case studies and practical resources.

U21 Global Citizens is a three-week online programme in which students explore the United Nations Sustainable Development Goals. Sustainable Micro-Internships are two-week online programmes in which international groups of students work on practical challenges set by organisations involved in advancing these goals.

=== Health sciences ===
The U21 Health Sciences Group (HSG) brings together health sciences staff and students within the network. Its disciplines include medicine, dentistry, nursing, pharmacy and public health. The group supports collaborative research, teaching and mobility programmes. Its activities include summer schools and interprofessional education, in which students from different health professions learn together.

=== Biodiversity and the Nature Positive Coalition ===
The U21 Nature Positive Coalition was launched in May 2025. Led by the University of Sydney and the University of Glasgow, it works with the Nature Positive Initiative to assess methods of measuring changes in biodiversity. The project examines the initiative's State of Nature metrics, bringing together ecological, legal, economic and social perspectives to evaluate their reliability and practical use in conservation and ecosystem restoration.

== Ranking of national higher education systems ==
From 2012 to 2020, Universitas 21 published the annual U21 Ranking of National Higher Education Systems. The reports were produced by researchers at the University of Melbourne under the leadership of Ross Williams. The ninth and final edition appeared in 2020.

In its final form, the ranking compared 50 national higher education systems using 24 indicators grouped into four areas: resources, environment, connectivity and output. These were combined into an overall ranking. A separate comparison adjusted performance for GDP per capita, allowing countries to be assessed in relation to their level of economic development. A 2013 study associated with the ranking found that countries performing strongly on output measures generally also performed strongly on resource measures, and reported a correlation between research output and government funding, particularly expenditure on research and development.

== Members ==
Country	Institution
Australia	University of Melbourne; University of New South Wales; University of Queensland; University of Sydney
Belgium	KU Leuven
Canada	McMaster University
Chile	Pontificia Universidad Católica de Chile
China	Fudan University; Shanghai Jiao Tong University
Finland	University of Helsinki
France	Paris-Saclay University
Hong Kong	University of Hong Kong
Indonesia	Universitas Gadjah Mada
Ireland	University College Dublin
Japan	Waseda University
Mexico	Tecnológico de Monterrey
Netherlands	University of Amsterdam
New Zealand	University of Auckland
Singapore	National University of Singapore
South Africa	University of Johannesburg
South Korea	Korea University
Sweden	Lund University
Switzerland	University of Zurich
United Kingdom	University of Birmingham; University of Edinburgh; University of Glasgow; University of Nottingham
United States	University of California, Davis; University of Connecticut; University of Illinois Urbana-Champaign; University of Maryland, College Park

== U21Global ==
U21Global was established in Singapore in 2001 as a joint venture between Universitas 21 and Thomson Learning, later known as Cengage Learning, to provide online higher education.

In 2007, Cengage sold its entire 50% stake to Mauritius-based Manipal Universal Learning International. The venture experienced financial losses and enrolments below its initial projections. In 2009, Universitas 21 announced that it would relinquish its controlling interest to the Manipal Group. By 2010, Manipal's stake had increased to 75%, with the remaining 25% held by university shareholders. The institution subsequently relocated to Malaysia and was renamed GlobalNxt University in 2012.

== See also ==
- List of higher education associations and alliances
