= Viral dynamics =

Viral dynamics is a field of applied mathematics concerned with describing the progression of viral infections within a host organism. It employs a family of mathematical models that describe changes over time in the populations of cells targeted by the virus and the viral load. These equations may also track competition between different viral strains and the influence of immune responses. The original viral dynamics models were inspired by compartmental epidemic models (e.g. the SI model), with which they continue to share many common mathematical features, such as the concept of the basic reproductive ratio (R_{0}). The major distinction between these fields is in the scale at which the models operate: while epidemiological models track the spread of infection between individuals within a population (i.e. "between host"), viral dynamics models track the spread of infection between cells within an individual (i.e. "within host"). Analyses employing viral dynamic models have been used extensively to study HIV, hepatitis B virus, and hepatitis C virus, among other infections
