= Eva-Maria Neher =

German chemist (born 1950)

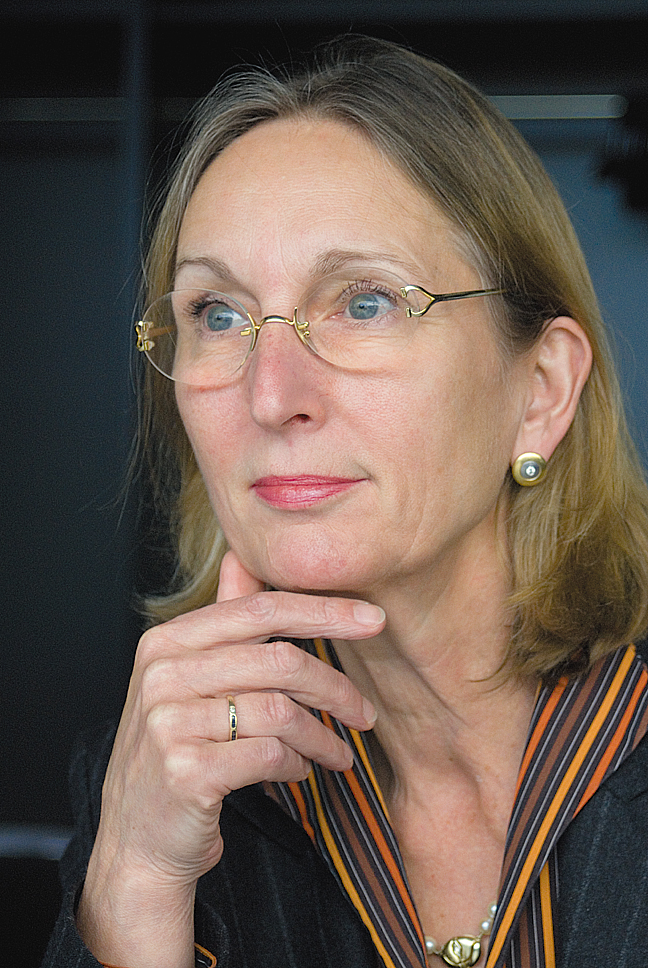
- Born: 22 November 1950 (age 75); Mülheim an der Ruhr, West Germany
- Occupation: Professor in microbiology
- Known for: Founding the Göttingen Xlab

Eva-Maria Neher (née Ruhr, born 22 November 1950) is a German scientist in the fields of biochemistry and microbiology. She founded the Göttingen Xlab and has been its executive director since 2000. The Göttingen Xlab is an experimental laboratory for training young people from student to scientist level. She is married to Erwin Neher who is a Nobel laureate for his Nobel Prize in Physiology or Medicine. She is the recipient of many awards, including the Lower Saxony State Prize.

== Biography ==
Neher was born in Mülheim, Germany. Her initial academic education as an undergraduate in microbiology was from 1969 to 1973 at the University of Göttingen. She received her diploma in biology in 1974, earning a PhD on biochemistry from the same university; her thesis was Regulation of the biosynthesis of poly-beta-hydroxybutyrate in Alcaligenes eutrophus H 16. She then worked in the same university as a staff scientist in 1977. From 1977–78 she also undertook postdoctoral research at the Max Planck Institute for Biophysical Chemistry in the Molecular Biology Department, Göttingen. While at the Charles Stevens Laboratory at Yale University for post-doctoral work she met Erwin Neher. She worked in his "Young Investigations Lab" and married him on 26 December 1978. Their five children – Richard, Benjamin, Carola, Sigmund, and Margret – were born by 1991. From 1978–1985 she was staff scientist at the Institute for Physiological Chemistry at the Georg August University and then till 2000 she was on maternal leave. During this period she also taught experimental courses in chemistry and biology at the Free Waldorf School, Göttingen. It was here she developed her approach for the Xlab which she founded in 2000, an experimental laboratory for young people. She has been its managing and executive director ever since. Xlab has been housed in a separate building on the North Campus since 2004.

When Neher was a professor at the University of Göttingen, she visited Moscow in June 1999. In 2013, she was a participant in the International Education Forum Hi-Tech Show in Moscow.

== Awards ==
Neher has received many awards, including:

- Niedersächsischer Verdienstorden (Lower Saxony Order of Merit) in 2002
- GBM-Kommunikationspreis, Gesellschaft für Biochemie und Molekularbiologie e.V. (GBM Communication Award of the German Society for Biochemistry and Molecular Biology) in 2005
- Niedersächsischer Staatspreis (Lower Saxony State Prize) in 2007
- Honorary professorship, Department of Chemistry, Georg August University, Göttingen in 2009
- Bundesverdienstkreuz 1. Klasse (Federal Cross of Merit First class) in 2009

== Bibliography ==
- Narins, Brigham (1 January 2001). Notable Scientists from 1900 to the Present: N-S. Gale Group. ISBN 978-0-7876-1755-4.
- Schoenfeld, Robert L (January 2006). Exploring the Nervous System: With Electronic Tools, an Institutional Base, a Network of Scientists. Universal-Publishers. ISBN 978-1-58112-461-3.
