= Richard A. Neher =

German biophysicist

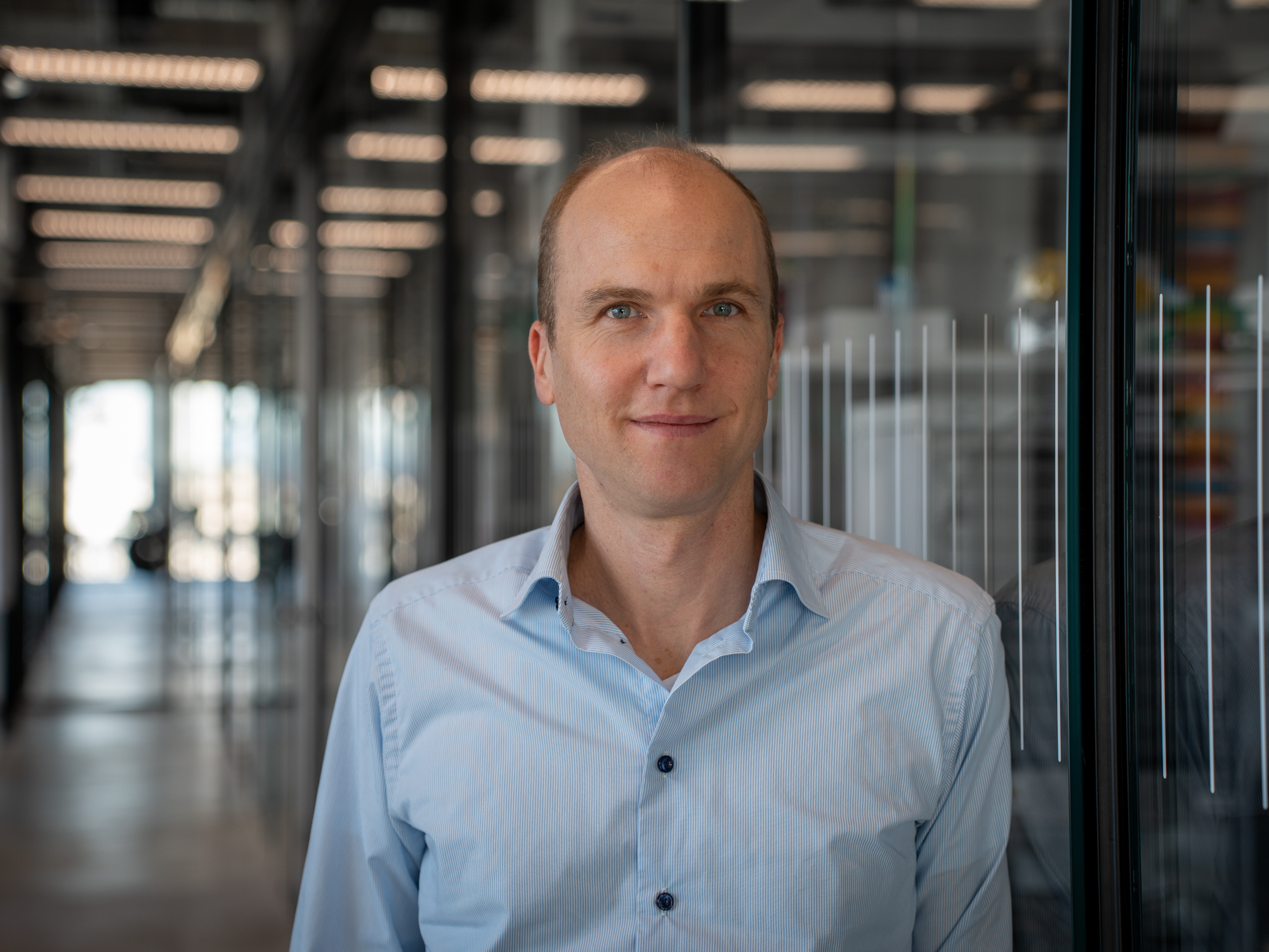
- Richard Neher (2025)
- Born: 30 August 1979 (age 46); Göttingen, Germany
- Scientific career
- Fields: Biophysicist
- Workplaces: Max-Planck-Institut, Kavli Institute for Theoretical Physics, University of California, Santa Barbara, Biozentrum University of Basel

Richard A. Neher (born 30 August 1979) is a German biophysicist and Professor of Computational Modelling of Biological Processes at the Biozentrum, University of Basel, Switzerland.

== Life and career ==
Richard Neher was born in Göttingen, West Germany. He studied physics at the University of Göttingen and LMU Munich between 1998 and 2003. He obtained his PhD in 2007 with a thesis on the dynamic aspects of DNA replication. Following his doctoral studies, he worked as a postdoctoral researcher at the Kavli Institute for Theoretical Physics at the University of California, Santa Barbara and later led a research group leader at the Max Planck Institute for Biology Tübingen, Germany. In 2017, he joined the Biozentrum of the University of Basel as an Associate Professor for Computational Modelling of Biological Processes, and was promoted to Full Professor in 2025.

Richard Neher is the eldest son of Nobel Prize winner Erwin Neher and his wife Eva-Maria Neher.

== Research ==
Neher's work focuses on the evolution of viruses and bacteria. His research group develops software and algorithms to track the spreading of these organisms and to analyse their genetic changes. He co-founded Nextstrain, an open-source platform for real-time tracking of viral pathogens, and has developed methods for predicting influenza virus evolution. During the COVID-19 pandemic, he was a member of the Swiss National COVID-19 Science Task Force, advising the federal government.

In addition to SARS-CoV-2, Neher also studies the evolution of human viruses such as HIV, influenza, and RSV. Another focus of his work is on the dynamics of bacterial "accessory genomes" acquired through horizontal gene transfer, which can contribute to environmental adaptation and antibiotic resistance.

== Awards and honours ==
- 2009: Harvey L. Karp Discovery Award
- 2011: European Research Council Starting Grant
- 2012: ARCHES award of the German Secretary of Science and Education
- 2016 Open Science Prize (Phase I, mit Trevor Bedford)
- 2017 Open Science Prize (Phase II, mit Trevor Bedford)
- 2024: National Prize for Open Research Data (ORD), Swiss Academies of Arts and Sciences for the joint project "Pathoplexus"
