= Seattle Coronavirus Assessment Network =

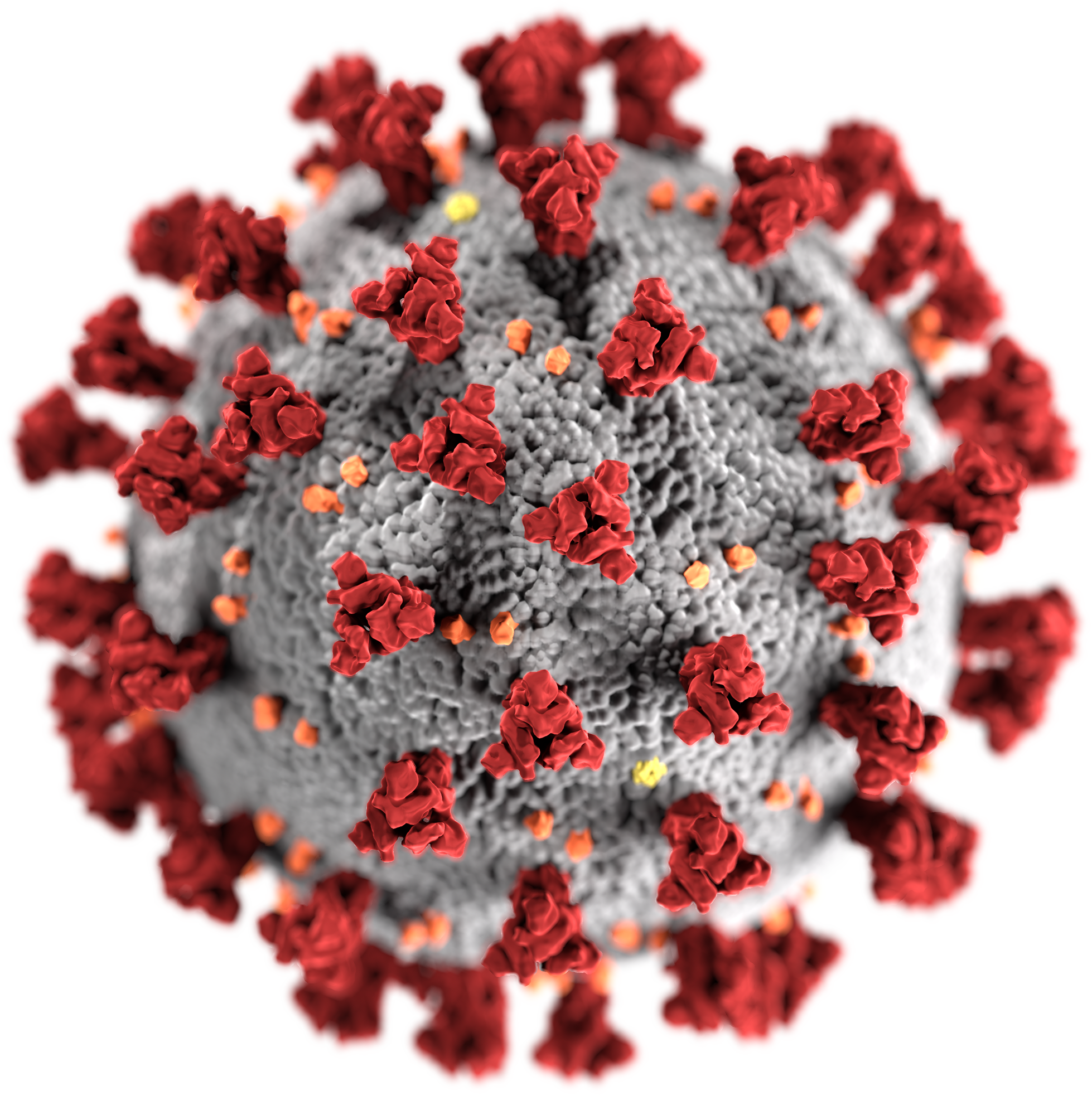
Illustration of a SARS-CoV-2 virion.

The Seattle Coronavirus Assessment Network (SCAN) is a public health surveillance program established in response to the COVID-19 pandemic. SCAN originated in March 2020 as a partnership between the Public Health department of Seattle and King County in Washington, USA and the Seattle Flu Study. SCAN's predecessor, the Seattle Flu Study, reported the first known case of community transmission of SARS-CoV-2 in the United States.

== Origin and ties to the Seattle Flu Study ==
The greater Seattle Coronavirus Assessment Network originated from the Seattle Flu Study, a public health surveillance program established in 2018. The Seattle Flu Study tracked the spread of bacterial and viral respiratory infections, including influenza, in the greater Seattle area by collecting nasal swabs from volunteers in the community. The public arm of the program allowed people to enroll online and request an at-home nasal swab sample collection kit, to be mailed back to the study team. Additional tests were performed at various locations throughout the community, including public transportation hubs, malls, hospitals and schools. During the 2018-2019 Flu season (October–May), the study collected 3,653 community samples, and 11,273 hospital samples. From January 1 through March 9, 2020, 3,524 samples were collected through online enrollment.

Following the first confirmed case of severe acute respiratory syndrome coronavirus 2 (SARS-CoV-2) during the COVID-19 outbreak in Washington state, the Seattle Flu Study team decided to test all received samples for SARS-CoV-2. A nasal swab collected by the Seattle Flu Study on February 24, 2020, became the first documented case of community transmission of SARS-CoV-2 in the United States.

== Regulatory challenges ==
SCAN's predecessor, the Seattle Flu Study, faced significant delays in acquiring federal regulatory approval to test samples for SARS-CoV-2, and made the decision to proceed with testing in the interest of public health. As of May 13, 2020, SCAN was required to halt testing by the United States Food and Drug Administration (FDA) until receiving additional approval from the agency. SCAN responded by noting that they initiated the process to gain FDA approval on March 23, 2020, and have submitted all requested data.

== Members and funding ==
SCAN began as a partnership between the Seattle Flu Study and Public Health - Seattle and King County. It is affiliated with the Brotman Baty Institute, a collaboration between the University of Washington School of Medicine, Fred Hutchinson Cancer Research Center, and Seattle Children's. It has received technical support from the Institute for Disease Modeling, Amazon Care, the Bill and Melinda Gates Foundation, and the Centers for Disease Control and Prevention (CDC). SCAN is funded by Gates Ventures.

== See also ==
- COVID-19 testing
- COVID-19 pandemic
- COVID-19 pandemic in the United States
- Helen Y. Chu, researcher; member of SCAN and Seattle Flu Study
