= Alexander L. Greninger =

American Virologst

Alexander L. Greninger is assistant director of the UW Medicine Clinical Virology Laboratory, director of the Retrovirology/Clinical Trials Laboratory, and the Larry Corey Endowed professor of Laboratory Medicine. His research is focused on genomic and proteomic characterization of a variety of human viruses and bacteria, with a focus on respiratory viruses and human herpesviruses.

== Education ==
Greninger earned his M.D. and Ph.D., from UC San Francisco and his M.Phil. in Epidemiology from Cambridge in England, and his M.S. in Immunology, B.A. in International Relations, and B.S. in Biological Sciences from Stanford.

== Career ==
Greninger helped in facilitating the first SARS-CoV-2 diagnostic test outside CDC or public laboratories. He was nominated to the Power List of 2020 by The Pathologist. On March 2, 2020, the UW Medicine Clinical Virology Lab received federal Emergency Use Authorization to use their RT-PCR test as a diagnostic tool for UW Medicine patients. By winter of 2020, the UW Medicine Clinical Virology Lab went from three PCR machines to more than 30 high-volume machines. The lab worked with the School of Medicine to secure equipment and space. The lab had tested over 4 million nasal swabs. Alongside UW Medicine's head of virology, Alex Greninger and Keith Jerome were named Innovators of the Year 2020 by the University of Washington School of Medicine for their foresight and innovation in developing one of the first tests in the country that detects COVID-19.

Greninger's laboratory in South Lake Union's neighborhood of Seattle, WA at the University of Washington School of Medicine focuses on understanding viruses using a wide range of techniques including next-generation sequencing, culture models and screens, and biochemical/biophysical characterization of viral gene products.

== Awards ==
Greninger received the 2024 ASM Early Career Clinical Microbiology Research Award. He was recognized at the 11th International Conference on HHV-6 & 7, for his work in the comparative, genomic, transcriptomic and proteomic re-annotation of HHV-6A/B, as well as his analysis of the heterogeneity, large origin tandem repeats and interspecies recombination in HHV-6A/B reference strains. Additionally, he uploaded over six dozen new genome sequences, expanding the publicly available sequences for HHV-6A/B.

He also received the Young Investigator Award by PASCV in 2018, Churchill Scholar for study at Cambridge University in 2004, Marco Escobar Award, American Society of Microbiology in 2016, was named to American Society of Clinical Pathologists "40 under 40" in 2017, the Strandjord-Clayson Award in 2018, and was named president, Associated Students of University of California-San Francisco during his Medical Scientist Training.
