= Three Minute Thesis =

University research presentation competition

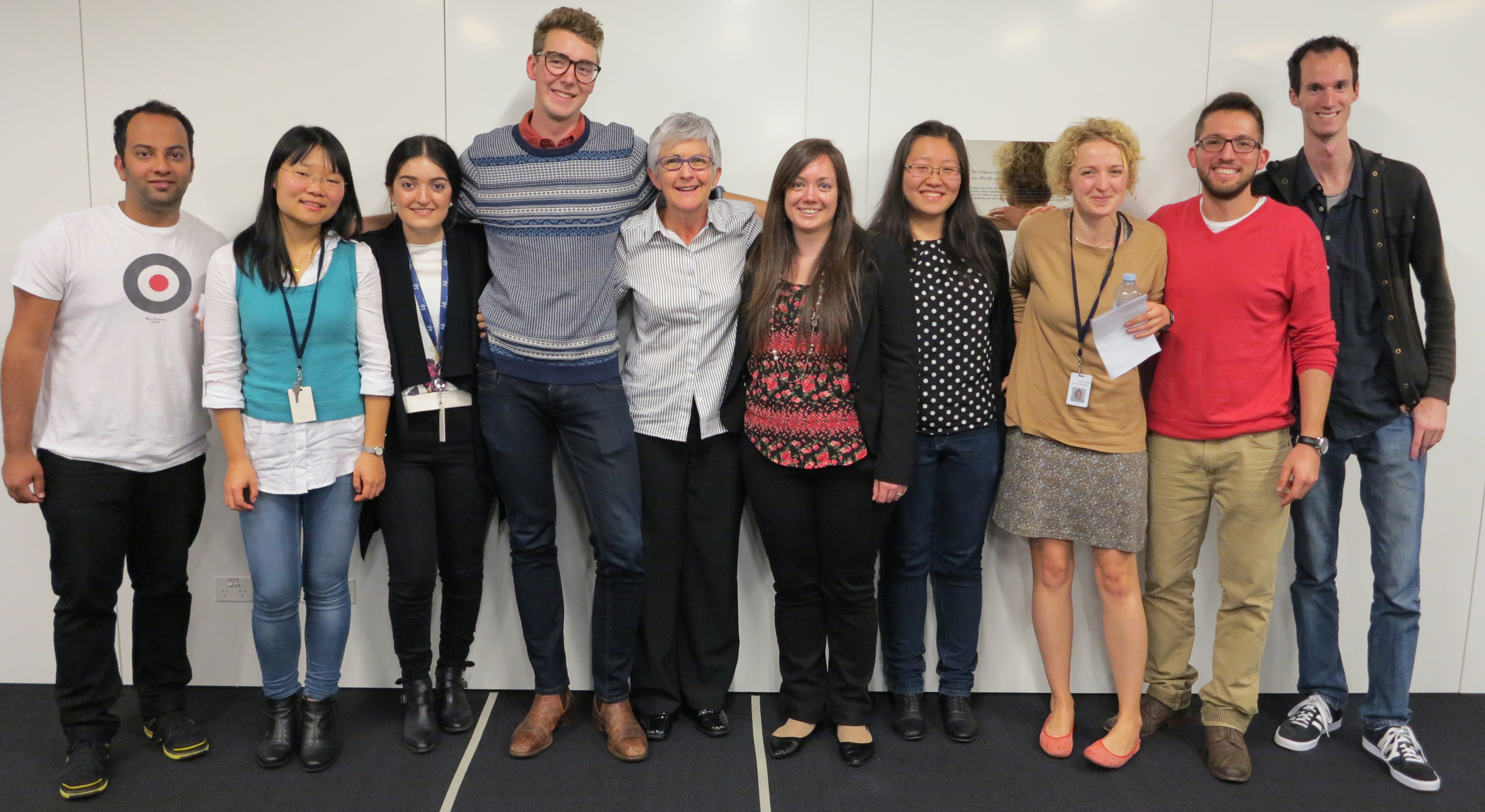
Participants in the St Vincent's Precinct heat of the UNSW Faculty of Medicine Three Minute Thesis Competition, held at the Garvan Institute of Medical Research in Sydney, Australia.

The Three Minute Thesis competition or 3MT, is an annual competition held in more than 200 universities worldwide. It is open to PhD students, and challenges participants to present their research in just 180 seconds, in an engaging form that can be understood by an intelligent audience with no background in the research area. This exercise develops presentation, research and academic communication skills and supports the development of research students' capacity to explain their work effectively.

== History ==
The competition originated at the University of Queensland (UQ) in 2008. In 2010 it began to expand to include other Australian universities in a 'trans-Tasman' competition which was further extended in 2016 to be 'Asia-Pacific'. Separate international competitions using the format have also been hosted by other universities, including the Universitas 21 group and Vitae group.

== Asia-Pacific competition winners ==
Year	Finals location	Winner	Runner up
2022	Virtual	Trevyn Toone (University of Auckland)	Amanda Khamis (The University of Sydney)
2015	University of Queensland	Eamonn Fahy (University of Melbourne)	Jaysuman Bin Pusppanathan (Universiti Teknologi Malaysia)
2014	University of Western Australia	Sarah Marley (Curtin University)	Rosanna Stevens (Australian National University)
2013	University of Western Sydney	Kelsey Kennedy (University of Western Australia)	Lilly Chang (University of Auckland)
2012	University of Queensland	Tim Paris (University of Western Sydney)	Lauren Hollier (University of Western Australia)
2011	University of Western Australia	Matthew Thompson (University of Queensland)	Suzie Ferrie (University of Sydney)
2010	University of Queensland	Balarka Banerjee (University of Western Australia)	Gabrielle Briggs (University of Newcastle)

== Participating countries and institutions ==
As of 20 Dec 2019, there were at least 85 participating countries from every continent (apart from Antarctica) and at least 941 institutions.
