= Helen Y. Chu =

American immunologist

- Education: Duke University; Cornell University
- Known for: Immunology; Virology
- Scientific career
- Fields: Maternal immunization
- Workplaces: University of Washington; Beth Israel Deaconess Medical Center
- Thesis: A prospective study of respiratory syncytial virus infection among children attending daycare (2012)

Helen Y. Chu is an American immunologist who is a professor of epidemiology and medicine at the University of Washington. Her research considers maternal immunization, with a focus on influenza and respiratory syncytial virus. During the COVID-19 pandemic, Chu was the first physician to recognize community transmission of the coronavirus disease within the United States.

== Education and early career ==
Chu was born in Western China. Her grandparents were academics in Luoyang. Her parent and grandparents were sent to work in countryside labor camps, but as her father had been born in the United States, her parents immigrated to Southern California. In 2001 Chu completed her bachelor's degree at Cornell University. She spent one year as a visiting student at the University of Oxford. She moved to Duke University to train in medicine. Chu was a medical resident at the Beth Israel Deaconess Medical Center. In 2009 Chu was appointed to the faculty at Harvard University, before being awarded a fellowship at the University of Washington in 2011. During the first year of her fellowship, Chu encountered the fields of public health and epidemiology through her work on Influenza A virus subtype H1N1.

== Research and career ==
Chu specializes in maternal immunization, with a particular focus on influenza and human orthopneumovirus. She is part of Seattle Flu Study, a multi-institutional community-wide virus surveillance platform that began in 2018. Traditionally, people rely on hospital admissions to know when the flu season begins and ends, but Chu believes that it spreads around the community through asymptomatic carriers who do not get admitted to hospital. As part of this study, Chu collects nasal swab samples from patients to better "detect, monitor, and control outbreaks" in Puget Sound. She makes use of a network of kiosks all around Seattle to collect these samples. She then sequences the genome of influenza viruses to track the flu as it moves around the city.

During the COVID-19 pandemic, Chu became concerned that human – human transmission of SARS-CoV-2 was occurring in Seattle. Whilst it would have been simple to repurpose the nasal swabs from the Seattle Flu Study to test for coronavirus disease, Chu was not given federal approval to do so. In an interview with The New York Times, Chu said, “We felt like we were sitting, waiting for the pandemic to emerge. We could help. We couldn’t do anything,”. In late February, Chu decided to test for coronavirus disease anyway, even without federal approval. Not long after she started testing, Chu identified a positive coronavirus disease test in a local teenager with no relevant travel history. Chu was the first physician in the United States to identify community transmission of coronavirus disease. Eric Feigl-Ding, epidemiologist at the Harvard T.H. Chan School of Public Health, said that Chu “is a true American hero, [who] actually broke this epidemic identified in Washington state when no one else wanted her to test for the virus,”. Despite this, Chu was told that she could not go on testing; because she did not have the correct clinical certification to run coronavirus disease tests. Chu believes that community transmission had occurred well before active surveillance began.

The Seattle Flu Study partnered with public health officials to launch a Seattle Coronavirus Assessment Network, who collect nasal swabs from people across Seattle in an effort to understand the spread of coronavirus disease. Chu shifted her research to focus on the identification of patients who had become infected with SARS-CoV-2. In early March Chu was awarded permission from the Food and Drug Administration to start COVID-19 testing. She conducted an investigation into the prevalence of coronavirus disease, enrolling participants online and rapidly distributing home testing kits. Kits were delivered with same-day delivery, sometimes within hours of people registering on the site, and samples were analysed within two days. Alongside her own research program to better understand the transmission and biology of SARS-CoV-2, Chu is involved with the National Institutes of Health COVID-19 vaccine trials and clinical trials into the use of antiviral drugs.

== Selected publications ==
- Steinhoff, Mark C; Katz, Joanne; Englund, Janet A; Khatry, Subarna K; Shrestha, Laxman; Kuypers, Jane; Stewart, Laveta; Mullany, Luke C; Chu, Helen Y; LeClerq, Steven C; Kozuki, Naoko (September 1, 2017). "Year-round influenza immunisation during pregnancy in Nepal: a phase 4, randomised, placebo-controlled trial". The Lancet Infectious Diseases. 17 (9): 981–989. doi:10.1016/S1473-3099(17)30252-9. ISSN 1473-3099. PMC 5573632. PMID 28522338.
- Perchetti, Garrett A; Wilcox, Naomi; Chu, Helen Y; Katz, Joanne; LeClerq, Steven C; Tielsch, James; Jerome, Keith R; Englund, Janet A; Kuypers, Jane (November 2, 2020). "Human Metapneumovirus Infection and Genotyping of Infants in Rural Nepal". Journal of the Pediatric Infectious Diseases Society. 10 (4): 408–416. doi:10.1093/jpids/piaa118. PMID 33137178.
- Mazur, Natalie I; Higgins, Deborah; Nunes, Marta C; Melero, José A; Langedijk, Annefleur C; Horsley, Nicole; Buchholz, Ursula J; Openshaw, Peter J; McLellan, Jason S; Englund, Janet A; Mejias, Asuncion (October 1, 2018). "The respiratory syncytial virus vaccine landscape: lessons from the graveyard and promising candidates". The Lancet Infectious Diseases. 18 (10): e295–e311. doi:10.1016/S1473-3099(18)30292-5. hdl:20.500.11820/c0495b39-2301-40af-a023-dfb5c51e6c1c. ISSN 1473-3099. PMID 29914800. S2CID 49300571.
- Chu, Helen Y.; Englund, Janet A. (August 15, 2014). "Maternal Immunization". Clinical Infectious Diseases. 59 (4): 560–568. doi:10.1093/cid/ciu327. ISSN 1058-4838. PMC 4168293. PMID 24799324.
