= Die Schneekönigin =

Fairy-tale opera by George Alexander Albrecht

- Fairy-tale opera by George Alexander Albrecht
- Librettist: Peter Truschner
- Language: German
- Based on: Andersen's "The Snow Queen"
- Premiere: 28 November 2015; Nationaltheater Weimar

Die Schneekönigin (The Snow Queen) is a fairy-tale opera by George Alexander Albrecht to a libretto by Peter Truschner based on Andersen's "The Snow Queen". It premiered at the Nationaltheater Weimar in 2015. The vocal parts are scored for professional soloists and children's choir, with choir members acting.

== History ==
On an initiative by Gudrun Schröfel, the conductor of the Mädchenchor Hannover, George Alexander Albrecht composed his only opera as an opera for children, to be performed by soloists and a chorus of children who also have to act. At the time, he was already aged 78, and had worked mostly as an opera conductor. The libretto was written by Peter Truschner, who wrote a rhymed version of Andersen's "The Snow Queen".

The opera premiered at the Nationaltheater Weimar in 2015, conducted by Dominik Beykirch, and directed by Maximilian von Mayenburg with set designs and costumes by Thilo Reuther. The premiere was prepared by a series of lectures at the Musikhochschule Weimar.

== Roles ==
Roles, voice types, premiere cast
Role	Voice type	Premiere cast, 28 November 2015 Conductor: Dominik Beykirch
Schneekönigin (The Snow Queen)	dramatic coloratura soprano	Lini Gong
Kobold (The Troll)	tenor	Jörn Eichler
Kay	mezzo-soprano	Eleonora Vacchi
Gerda	soprano	Steffi Lehmann
Großmutter (The Grandmother)	alto	Rebecca Teem
Ronja	mezzo-soprano	Sayaka Shigeshima
Rabe (The Crow)	bass	Daeyoung Kim
Rentier (Bae)	baritone	Alik Abdukayumov
Choir

== Music ==
The vocal parts are scored for professional soloists and children's choir, with choir members acting in roles such as flowers (Blumen), ravens (Raben), robbers (Räuber), snowflakes (Schneeflocken), wind and ice crystals. The music around the Snow Queen character is set atonal, contrasting with the human world. The children, Gerda and Kay, are characterised by song-like music, the troll declaims like Mime in Wagner's Siegfried, the Snow Queen sings in extremely high register, and scenes for ravens and robbers resemble operetta. The opera takes around 80 minutes to perform.

The score calls for an orchestra including flute, oboe, 2 clarinets, bassoon, 2 horns, trumpet, trombone, tuba, timpani, 2 drums, harp and strings.

== Reception ==
Roland H. Dippel wrote in a review published in Leipziger Volkszeitung, Oper & Tanz and Neue Musikzeitung, that the opera deals with great emotions, proving oneself in dangers, and faith in the good. ("Es geht um große Gefühle, Gefahren, Bewährungen und den Glauben an das Gute.") He summarised: "A real opera with a large orchestra that fascinates its young audience for the art form" ("Eine echte Oper mit großem Orchester, die ihr junges Publikum für die Kunstform fasziniert").
