= Maddalena Casulana =

Italian composer and musician

Maddalena Casulana (c. 1535 – c. 1590) was an Italian composer, lutenist and singer of the late Renaissance. She is the first female composer to have had a whole book of her music printed and published in the history of western music, dedicated to her female patron Isabella de' Medici.

== Life and work ==
Extremely little is known about her life, other than what can be inferred from the dedications and writings on her collections of madrigals. Casulana appears to not be her given name, but rather acquired by marriage to her first husband, who was likely from Casole d'Elsa, near Siena.

Her first work dates from 1566: four madrigals in a collection, Il Desiderio, which she produced in Florence. Two years later she published in Venice her first actual book of madrigals for four voices, Il primo libro di madrigali a 4 voci, which is the first printed, published work by a woman in western music history. Also that year Orlando di Lasso conducted Nil mage iucundum at the court of Wilhelm V, Duke of Bavaria in Munich; however the music has not survived.

She evidently was close to Isabella de' Medici, and dedicated some of her music to her. In 1570, 1583 and 1586 she published other books of madrigals, all at Venice. Sometime during this period she married a man named Mezari, but no other information is known about him, or where she (or they) were living. Evidently she visited Verona, Milan and Florence, based on information contained in dedications, and likely she went to Venice as well, since her music was published there and numerous Venetians commented on her abilities. She made at least one voyage to the French imperial court in the 1570s.

The following line in the dedication to her first book of madrigals, to Isabella de' Medici, shows her feeling about being a female composer at a time when such a thing was rare: "[I] want to show the world, as much as I can in this profession of music, the vain error of men that they alone possess the gifts of intellect and artistry, and that such gifts are never given to women."

== Style ==
Her style is moderately contrapuntal and chromatic, reminiscent of some of the early work by Marenzio as well as many madrigals by Philippe de Monte, but avoids the extreme experimentation of the Ferrara school composers such as Luzzaschi and Gesualdo. Her melodic lines are singable and carefully attentive to the text. Casulana favoured dramatic dialogue in her polyphonic vocal works. This is demonstrated in her madrigal, "Morte - Che voi - Te Chiamo?", in which she alternates different voices to highlight the questions and answers of the text.

Other composers of the time, such as Philippe de Monte, thought highly of her; that Lassus conducted a work of hers at a wedding in Bavaria suggests that he also was impressed with her ability. A total of 66 madrigals by Casulana have survived.

In 2022 it was announced that a further 17 madrigals have been added to her surviving repertoire, with twelve of the pieces being performed for the first time in 400 years on 8 March 2022, by the Fieri Consort, as part of the BBC Radio 3's programming for International Women’s Day. The discoveries were made by Laurie Stras, Professor of Music at the Universities of Southampton and Huddersfield, who identified the lost alto partbook of Casulana's 1583 book of five-voice madrigals in the Russian State Library in Moscow, thought to have been looted from the Gdańsk Library of the Polish Academy of Sciences during the Second World War, and still bearing Gdańsk's catalogue numbers.

== Discography ==
- Bonds, Mark Evan. A History of Music in Western Culture. Vol. 1. Pearson/Prentice Hall, 2014, 6 compact discs accompany text of same title. Originally released in 2010.
- Briscoe, James R., comp. New Historical Anthology of Music by Women.. Indiana University Press, 2004, 3 compact discs accompanying an anthology of scores. Originally released in 1991.
- I canti di Euterpe, sec. XVI. Ensemble Laus contentus.Recorded in 1998. La bottega discantica, Discantica 37, 1998, compact disc.
- English and Italian Renaissance Madrigals. Virgin 7243 5 61671 2 4, 1999, 2 compact discs. Originally released in 1987.
- The Excellence of Women: Casulana & Strozzi, The Fieri Consort, 2024, Fieri Records.
- Frauensaiten: die weibliche Seite der Musik. The Hilliard Ensemble, et al. EMI Electrola 7243 4 78380 2 6, 1997, compact disc. Originally released as LP in 1955.
- Full Well She Sang: Women’s Music from the Middle Ages & Renaissance. Marquis MAR 81445, 2013, compact disc. Originally released in 1991.
- Italian Renaissance Madrigals. EMI Classics CDC 7 54435 2, 1992, compact disc.
- Understanding Music: Student's Compact Disc Collection. Sony Music Special Products A3 24952, 1996, 3 compact discs accompany textbook of same title.
- Verklingend und ewig: Raritäten aus der Herzog August Bibliothek Wolfenbüttel. Capella Augusta Guelferbytana, Mädchenchor Hannover (Gudrun Schröfel, cond.); Knabenchor Hannover (Jörg Breiding, cond.). Recorded July 4–9, 2011. Rondeau ROP6054, 2011, compact disc.

== Work Index ==
This index provides a list of Casulana's works and a reference from the original publication. Available recordings are provided in the third column.

work title	original publication	available on CD
Adio Lidia mia bella	Madrigals, bk. 2, [no. 8]	Verklingend und ewig: Raritäten aus der Herzog August Bibliothek Wolfenbüttel
Ahi possanza d'amor	Madrigals, bk. 2, [no. 4]	Verklingend und ewig: Raritäten aus der Herzog August Bibliothek Wolfenbüttel
Amor per qual cagion	Madrigals, bk. 2 [no. 2]	Verklingend und ewig: Raritäten aus der Herzog August Bibliothek Wolfenbüttel
Amor per qual cagion	Madrigals, bk. 2 [no. 2]	Full Well She Sang: Women's Music from the Middle Ages & Renaissance.
Amorosetto fiore	Third Book of Desire: 4-Part Madrigals by Lasso... [no. 7]	not yet recorded
Ben venga il pastor mio	Madrigals, bk. 2 [no. 7]	Verklingend und ewig: Raritäten aus der Herzog August Bibliothek Wolfenbüttel
Cinta di fior un giorno	Madrigals, bk. 2 [no. 9]	Verklingend und ewig: Raritäten aus der Herzog August Bibliothek Wolfenbüttel
Come fra verd' erbette	Madrigals, bk. 2 [no. 17]	Verklingend und ewig: Raritäten aus der Herzog August Bibliothek Wolfenbüttel
Dea che nel mar nacque, La	Madrigals, bk. 2 [no. 11]	Verklingend und ewig: Raritäten aus der Herzog August Bibliothek Wolfenbüttel
Gli ochi lucent' e belli	Madrigals, bk. 2 [no. 10]	Verklingend und ewig: Raritäten aus der Herzog August Bibliothek Wolfenbüttel
Gran miracol d'amore	Madrigals, bk. 2 [no. 20]	Rarities from the Herzog August Bibliothek Wolfenbüttel
Io d'odorate fronde	Madrigals, bk. 2 [no. 3]	Full Well She Sang: Women's Music from the Middle Ages & Renaissance.
Io d'odorate fronde	Madrigals, bk. 2 [no. 3]	Verklingend und ewig: Raritäten aus der Herzog August Bibliothek Wolfenbüttel
Io felice pastore	Madrigals, bk. 2 [no. 12]	Full Well She Sang: Women's Music from the Middle Ages & Renaissance.
Monti selve fontane	Madrigals, bk. 2 [no. 14]	Verklingend und ewig: Raritäten aus der Herzog August Bibliothek Wolfenbüttel
Morir non può il mio cuore	Madrigals, bk. 1	I canti di Euterpe, 16th c.
Morir non può il mio cuore	Madrigals, bk. 1	English and Italian Renaissance Madrigals
Morir non può il mio cuore	Madrigals, bk. 1	Frauensaiten: Die weibliche Seite der Musik
Morir non può il mio coure	Madrigals, bk. 1	A History of Music in Western Culture
Morir non può il mio coure	Madrigals, bk. 1	Italian Renaissance Madrigals
Morir non può il mio coure	Madrigals, bk. 1	Understanding Music: Student's Compact Disc Collection
Morte--Che vôi--Te chiamo	Madrigals, bk. 2 [no. 6]	New Historical Anthology of Music by Women
Morte--Che vôi--Te chiamo	Madrigals, bk. 2 [no. 6]	Verklingend und ewig: Raritäten aus der Herzog August Bibliothek Wolfenbüttel
O notte o ciel o mar	Madrigals, bk. 2 [no. 5]	I canti di Euterpe, 16th c.
O notte o ciel o mar	Madrigals, bk. 2 [no. 5]	Verklingend und ewig: Raritäten aus der Herzog August Bibliothek Wolfenbüttel
Per lei pos' in oblio	Madrigals, bk. 2 [no. 13]	Verklingend und ewig: Raritäten aus der Herzog August Bibliothek Wolfenbüttel
Ridon or per le piaggie	Madrigals, bk. 2 [no. 1]	Full Well She Sang: Women's Music from the Middle Ages & Renaissance.
Ridon or per le piaggie	Madrigals, bk. 2 [no. 1]	Verklingend und ewig: Raritäten aus der Herzog August Bibliothek Wolfenbüttel
S'alcun vi mira fiso	Madrigals, bk. 2 [no. 16]	Verklingend und ewig: Raritäten aus der Herzog August Bibliothek Wolfenbüttel
Sculpio ne l'am' Amore	Madrigals, bk. 1	not yet recorded
Se sciôr si ved'il laccio a cui dianz'io	Madrigals, bk. 1	not yet recorded
Stavasi il mio bel Sol	Il Gaudio (1586)	Verklingend und ewig: Raritäten aus der Herzog August Bibliothek Wolfenbüttel
Tra verdi frondi	Madrigals, bk. 2 [no. 21]	not yet recorded
Vagh'amorosi augelli	Madrigals, bk. 2 [no. 15]	I canti di Euterpe, 16th c.
Vedesti Amor giamai	Madrigals, bk. 1	not yet recorded
Vivo ardor viva fiamma	Vivo ardor viva fiamma	Verklingend und ewig: Raritäten aus der Herzog August Bibliothek Wolfenbüttel
vostro dipartir, Il	Madrigals, bk. 2 [no. 19]	Verklingend und ewig: Raritäten aus der Herzog August Bibliothek Wolfenbüttel

== Bibliography ==
- Bridges, Thomas W. "Maddalena Casulana". The New Grove Dictionary of Music and Musicians. Edited by Stanley Sadie. Washington, D. C.: Grove's Dictionaries of Music, 1980.
- Bridges, Thomas W. "Madelana Casulana" in The Norton/Grove Dictionary of Women Composers. Edited by Julie Anne Sadie and Rhian Samuel. New York: W. W. Norton, 1995.
- Chater, James. "'Such sweet sorrow': The Dialogo di partenza in the Italian Madrigal." Early Music 27, no. 4 (November 1999): 576–88, 590–99.
- Deutsch, Catherine. Maddalena Casulana: Music Advocating for Women in Early Modern Italy. Cambridge, Cambridge University Press, 2025.
- Gough, Melinda J. "Marie de Medici's 1605 ballet de la reine and the Virtuosic Female Voice." Early Modern Women 7 (2012): 127–56.
- Hadden, Nancy. "Changing Women: Performers, Patrons and Composers in Renaissance Europe." IAWM Journal 18, no. 1 (June 2012):14–20.
- Heere-Beyer, Samantha E. "Claiming Voice: Madalena Casulana and the Sixteenth-Century Italian Madrigal." MM thesis, University of Pittsburgh, 2009.
- LaMay, Thomasin. "Composing from the Throat: Madalena Casulana's Primo libro de madrigali, 1568." In Musical Voices of Early Modern Women: Many-Headed Melodies. Edited by Thomasin LaMay. Burlington, VT: Ashgate, 2005.
- LaMay, Thomasin. "Madalena Casulana: My Body Knows Unheard of Songs." In Gender, Sexuality, and Early Music. Edited by Todd C. Borgerding. New York: Routledge, 2002, 41–72.
- Lindell, Robert. "Music and Patronage at the Court of Rudolf II." In Music in the German Renaissance: Sources, Styles, and Contexts. Edited by John Kmetz. Cambridge: Cambridge University Press, 1994.
- MacAuslan, Janna and Kristan Aspen. "Noteworthy Women: Renaissance Women in Music." Hot Wire (1993): 12–13. EBSCOhost (accessed October 18, 2016).
- Newcomb, Anthony. "Giovanni Maria Nanino’s Early Patrons in Rome." The Journal of Musicology 30, no. 1 (2013): 103–27.
- Pendle, Karin. "Musical Women in Early Modern Europe." Women & Music: a History, Indiana University Press, 2001.
- Pescerelli, Beatrice, ed. I madrigali di Maddalena Casulana. Florence: L.S. Olschki, 1979.
- Pescerelli, Beatrice. "Maddalena Casulana". In The Historical Anthology of Music by Women. Edited by James R. Briscoe. Bloomington: Indiana U P, 1986.
- Willimann, Joseph. "'Indi non piùdes io': Vom Verzichten und Begehren: Die Madrigale von Maddalena Casulana." Musik & Ästhetik 10, no. 37 (2006): 71–97.
