= Barbara Koerppen =

German violinist (1930–2023)

- Barbara Koerppen, in the 1970s
- Born: 5 January 1930; Stolp, Pomerania, Prussia, Germany
- Died: 7 June 2023 (aged 93)
- Occupations: Classical violinist; Academic teacher
- Organisations: Kammerorchester Barbara Koerppen; Junges Sinfonieorchester Hannover; Hochschule für Musik und Theater Hannover; Alfred Koerppen Stiftung
- Spouse: Alfred Koerppen (m. 1960; died 2022)
- Awards: Order of Merit of the Federal Republic of Germany

Barbara Koerppen (born Boehr, 5 January 1930 – 7 June 2023) was a German violinist. She was a professor at the Hochschule für Musik Hannover, and founded a youth symphony orchestra, playing as its concertmaster.

== Life and career ==
Born in Stolp, Pomerania, on 5 January 1930 the daughter of Gerta Boehr and the jurist Günther Boehr, she received violin instructions from age five, first from Gabriele Peters, then after the family moved to Hannover in 1939 from Frieda Ritter.

Koerppen studied violin from 1948 at the Landesmusikschule in Hannover (later the Hochschule für Musik), with Hans Gravens, concert master of the NDR orchestra, and Lilli Friedemann, who trained her in Alte Musik. She studied improvisation and figured bass with Alfred Koerppen, who taught composition and music theory. They married in 1960.

Koerppen worked as organist in church service and gave violin lessons. From 1963, she lectured violin and violin method at the Musikhochschule. She served in the institution's senate, and in various functions such as orchestra rehearsals for Felix Prohaska. She toured to Japan where she worked with Shinichi Suzuki, promoting his method in Germany. She also served on the jury of the Jugend musiziert competition on state and national level, and was a lector of pedagogical works for publishing houses. She was concertmaster of the Handel Festival in Herrenhausen, in the Hausegger-Orchester and in the chamber music ensemble of Ferdinand Conrad. In this function, she played in the first performance in Rome of Paul Hindemith's version of Monteverdi's L’Orfeo, and worked with Enrico Mainardi and Carlo Secchi. Koerppen was concertmaster for a performance of Bach's Christmas Oratorio (Parts I–III) at the Stadthalle Hannover in 1964, with the Knabenchor Hannover and soloists Siff Petersen, Marga Höffgen, Josef Traxel and Kieth Engen. She premiered works by her husband, such as the song cycle Dauer der Freude in Munich 1967. She took part in a 1973 recording for the NDR of her husband's chamber music works, called Alfred Koerppen Edition 3.

In 1954, she founded the Kammerorchester Barbara Koerppen, a chamber orchestra which she led as concertmaster until 1979; most instrumentalists were musicians from the radio orchestra. They played in a radio recording of Bach's cantata Himmelskönig, sei willkommen, BWV 182, in the early 1960s, conducted by Ulrich Bremsteller. In 1961, she co-founded with Heinz Hennig and Erwin Wolf the Junges Sinfonieorchester Hannover, a youth symphony orchestra. The ensemble was founded along with the Knabenchor Hannover and the Mädchenchor Hannover, both Hennig's creations. She directed it until 1974. She also held orchestra and chamber music seminars at the Senioren-Akademie Hamburg for more than ten years, and took part on orchestra seminars at the Bundesakademie Trossingen.

In 1973, Koerppen was appointed professor at the Musikhochschule. One of her students was Sibylle Wolf.

Together with her husband, she founded in 2002 the Alfred Koerppen Stiftung, a foundation towards the creation, publication and performance of new classical music.

Koerppen died on 7 June 2023, at the age of 93.

== Awards ==
In 1965, Koerppen was awarded the Niedersachsenpreis für Musik of Lower Saxony, and in 1992 the Order of Merit of the Federal Republic of Germany.

== Publications ==
- Barbara Koerppen, Hans-Joachim Vetter, Eckart Rohlfs (eds.): Lehrplan Violine, 2nd edition (July 1992), commissioned by Verband deutscher Musikschulen, Kassel: Bosse, 2008, ISBN 978-3-7649-3511-5
