= George Alexander Albrecht =

German conductor and composer (1935–2021)

- Born: 15 February 1935; Leuchtenburg, Prussia, Germany
- Died: 21 December 2021 (aged 86)
- Occupations: Conductor; Composer; Musicologist; Academic teacher
- Organizations: Staatsoper Hannover; Semperoper; Nationaltheater Weimar; Hochschule für Musik Franz Liszt, Weimar
- Children: 5, including Marc Albrecht
- Father: Carl Albrecht
- Relatives: Albrecht family
- Awards: Lower Saxony Order of Merit; Order of Merit of the Federal Republic of Germany

George Alexander Albrecht (15 February 1935 – 21 December 2021) was a German conductor and composer, who also worked as a musicologist and academic teacher. A prolific composer at a young age, he was Generalmusikdirektor (GMD) of the Staatsoper Hannover from 1965 for 30 years, where he led not only the major operas by Mozart and stageworks by Wagner, but contemporary composers, such as Aribert Reimann's Troades in 1987. He was GMD of the Nationaltheater Weimar from 1996, and taught at the Hochschule für Musik Franz Liszt, Weimar. Albrecht promoted the works of neglected composers such as Wilhelm Furtwängler, Hans Pfitzner, and Erwin Schulhoff.

In retirement, he focused on composing again. His fairy-tale opera Die Schneekönigin, after Andersen's "The Snow Queen", was premiered in Weimar in 2015. His Requiem für Syrien for soloists, choir and orchestra was first performed in Dresden in 2018 by the Dresdner Philharmonie, and his First Symphony "Sinfonia di due Mondi" for mezzo-soprano and large orchestra was premiered in 2019 by the Staatskapelle Weimar, conducted by his son Marc Albrecht.

== Biography ==
Albrecht was born in the Leuchtenburg part of Osterholz, Hanover, Germany, the son of psychologist, psychotherapist and physician Carl Albrecht. He was a member of the Albrecht family: His brother Ernst Albrecht (1930–2014) was a politician, and EU Commission President Ursula von der Leyen was his niece. He was a choirboy at the Church of Our Lady, Bremen.

At age 11, in October 1946, Albrecht wrote his first composition and later studied piano with Rudolf Hindemith. In 1949, he conducted his first concert. Albrecht studied violin, piano, and composition with Paul van Kempen in Siena and Hilversum, and in 1954 he received the Prix d'excellence of the Accademia Musicale Chigiana in Siena. At the age of 24, he became a répétiteur at the Theater Bremen (1958–1961). In 1958, Rudolf Hindemith's opera Des Kaisers neue Kleider after Andersen's "The Emperor's New Clothes" was premiered in Bremen. From 1961 to 1965, he was first conductor at the Landestheater Hannover, with the Niedersächsisches Staatsorchester Hannover.

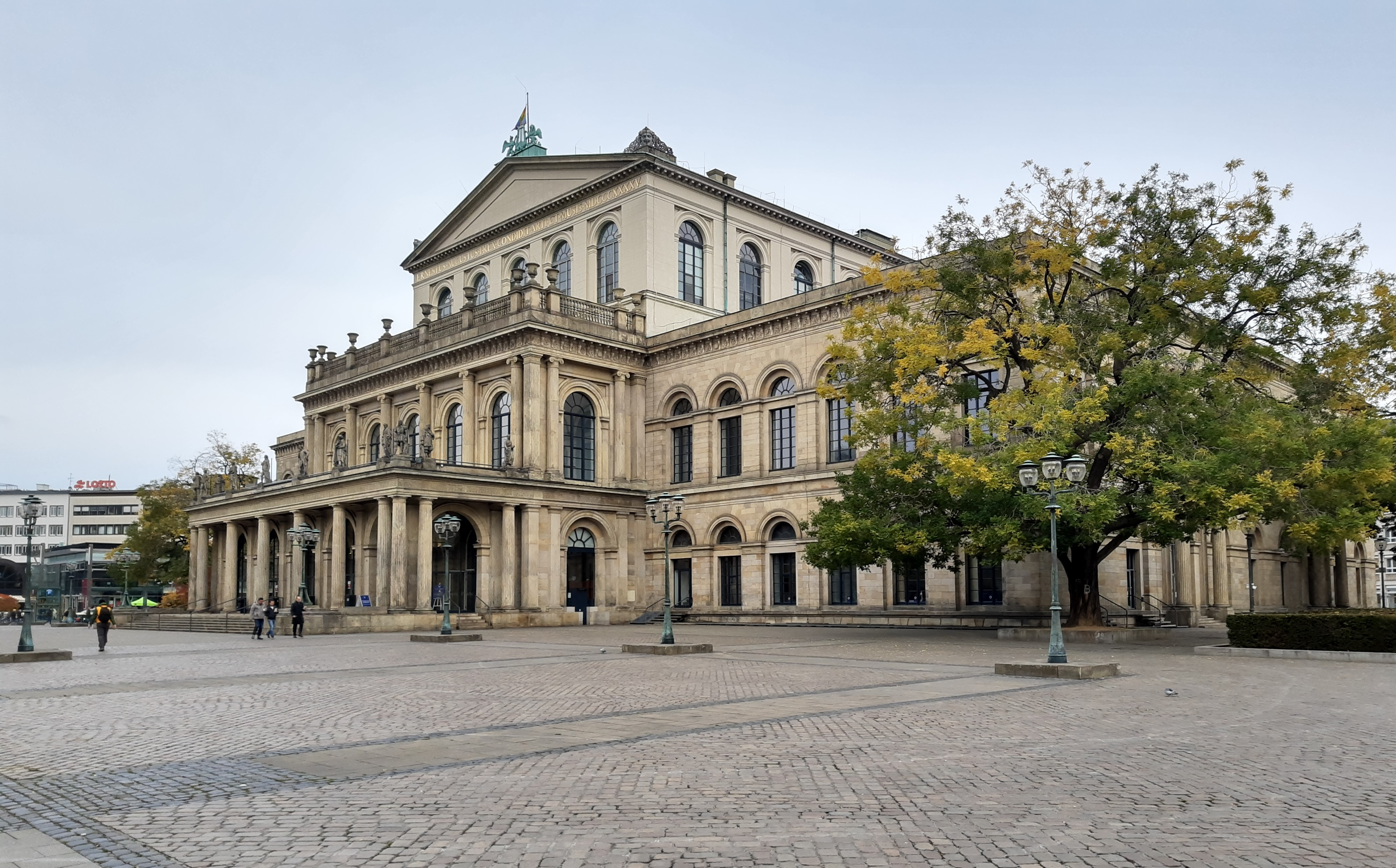
Staatsoper Hannover

In 1965, Albrecht became Generalmusikdirektor (GMD) of the Staatsoper Hannover, at age 29 then the youngest GMD in Germany. He focused on the symphonies of Gustav Mahler and Anton Bruckner. He programmed all major operas by Mozart and stageworks by Wagner. Albrecht performed Wagner's Der Ring des Nibelungen staged by intendant Hans-Peter Lehmann with sets and costumes by Ekkehard Grübler. In 1983, he revived Marschner's Hans Heiling; an opera whose composer had also been conductor at the Hannover opera. Albrecht then conducted some of the more infrequently presented operas, like Janáček's Jenufa, Handel's Jephta and Hercules, Wolf-Ferrari's Sly and Alban Berg's Lulu. He introduced contemporary composers, conducting Aribert Reimann's Troades in 1987, and Bernd Alois Zimmermann's Die Soldaten in 1989. He conducted a production of Schoenberg's Moses und Aron, staged by George Tabori, for both Hannover and Oper Leipzig. He worked together with an ensemble of singers including Isoldé Elchlepp, Renate Behle and Waltraud Meier. Albrecht concluded his tenure in Hannover with the 1992/93 season.

Albrecht was guest conductor of the Berlin Philharmonic and Munich Philharmonic, the Bamberg Symphony and the Leipzig Gewandhaus Orchestra. He made further guest appearances in New York, St. Petersburg, Tokyo and Barcelona. He conducted Wagner's Der fliegende Holländer at the Vienna State Opera in 1985, and returned for other stage works by Wagner. From 1990 to 1995, Albrecht was a regular guest conductor of the Semperoper in Dresden, where his work included conducting the Tabori production of Moses und Aron in 1994. As the 24th successor of Kapellmeister Johann Sebastian Bach, he served as GMD of the Deutsches Nationaltheater und Staatskapelle Weimar from 1996 to 2002. On 1 January 2002, he had a cardiac arrest on stage at New Year's Concert conducting Beethoven's Ninth Symphony. Following 2002, he was honorary conductor and returned to composing.

Albrecht championed the music of Wilhelm Furtwängler, Hans Pfitzner, and Erwin Schulhoff among others. He taught at the Musikhochschule Hannover and Hochschule für Musik Franz Liszt, Weimar.

== Personal life ==
Albrecht married twice and became a father five times. The conductor Marc Albrecht is his son from his marriage to Corinne, a ballet dancer who became a physiotherapist. He was later married to pianist Liese Klahn, daughter of Erich Klahn. Albrecht became involved in hospice work and was a devout Catholic. In spring 2021, he and his wife moved from Weimar to Southern Germany.

He died on 21 December 2021, at the age of 86.

== Awards ==
- 1985 Gustav Mahler Gold Medal of the Internationale Gustav Mahler Gesellschaft
- 1993 Cross of the Lower Saxony Order of Merit
- 1998 Cross of the Order of Merit of the Federal Republic of Germany
- 2005 Conductors Award in the opera category from the Australian critic's Green Room Award for a new production of Wagner's The Flying Dutchman at Opera Australia in Sydney and Melbourne

== Compositions ==
Albrecht's compositions have been described as basically tonal, traditional and neo-romantic. At the age of 22, Albrecht had already composed 116 works. He returned to composing in 2009, and wrote a string trio for his daughters, followed by a piano quintet. He wrote five string quartets. Commissioned by Silvius von Kessel, he wrote a motet for the Dombergchor Erfurt about the life of Saint Elisabeth. He composed many lieder for different ensembles, inspired by poetry of Gerhard Altenbourg, Ernst Barlach, Paul Celan, Gerhart Hauptmann and Erich Kästner's "Die 13 Monate", and a cycle setting texts from Buchenwald concentration camp.

Albrecht composed an opera for children Die Schneekönigin, after Andersen's fairy-tale "The Snow Queen", initiated by Gudrun Schröfel, the conductor of the Mädchenchor Hannover. It was premiered in Weimar in 2015. His Requiem für Syrien (Requiem for Syria) for soloists, choir and orchestra was first performed in Dresden in June 2018 by the Dresdner Philharmonie conducted by Michael Sanderling. His First Symphony "Sinfonia di due Mondi" for mezzo-soprano and large orchestra on texts by Ulla Hahn received its world premiere in August 2019 by the Staatskapelle Weimar, conducted by his son Marc Albrecht.

His works include:

- 2015 (or 2016) Abwege für ein Barockensemble – OCLC 933890528
- 2015 Vier Buchenwald-Gesänge – OCLC 910839391
- 2015 19 Lieder – nach Gedichten von Harald Albrecht – OCLC 976505522
- 2015 Die Schneekönigin, fairy-tale opera – OCLC 937039731
- 2015 Himmel über Syrien – OCLC 911265620
- 2015 Der Geistkämpfer – Fünf Gesänge nach Texten von Ernst Barlach – OCLC 914163551
- 2016 Von guten Mächten – OCLC 941730203
- 2016 Heilige Elisabeth – OCLC 1034566968
- 2016/2017 Requiem für Syrien – OCLC 1128845589
- 2019 Symphony No. 1 "Sinfonia di due Mondi", for mezzo-soprano and large orchestra on texts by Ulla Hahn – OCLC 1128852421

== Publications ==
- Albrecht, George (1987). Das sinfonische Werk Hans Pfitzners: Textkritische Anmerkungen und Hinweise zur Aufführungspraxis (in German). Tutzing: H. Schneider. ISBN 978-3-7952-0505-8. OCLC 17677016.
- Albrecht, George (1992). Die Symphonien von Gustav Mahler: Eine Einführung; (in German). Hameln: Niemeyer. ISBN 978-3-8271-9241-7. OCLC 831836076.
- Furtwängler, Wilhelm; Albrecht, George Alexander (ed.) (2004). Sinfonisches Konzert für Klavier und Orchester. In: Furtwängler, Wilhelm, 1886–1954. Works. 2002. Werkgruppe 1, Werke für Orchester; Bd. 4. Berlin: Ries & Erler. OCLC 57218704

== Recordings ==
Three CDs with all of Furtwängler's symphonies have been released with the Staatskapelle Weimar.

Preceded by Günter Wich	Generalmusikdirektor, Staatsoper Hannover; 1965–1993	Succeeded by Christof Perick
Preceded by Hans-Peter Frank	Chief Conductor, Staatskapelle Weimar; 1996–2002	Succeeded by Jac van Steen
