= Richard Wetz =

German composer (1875–1935)

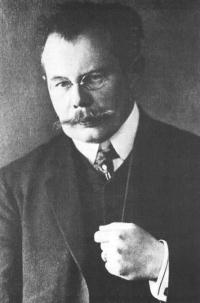
- Wetz in 1911
- Born: 26 February 1875; Gleiwitz, Upper Silesia, German Empire
- Died: 16 January 1935 (aged 59); Erfurt, Saxony
- Education: Royal Conservatory in Leipzig; Leipzig University
- Occupation: Composer

Richard Wetz (26 February 1875 – 16 January 1935) was a German late Romantic composer best known for his three symphonies. In these works, he "seems to have aimed to be an immediate continuation of Bruckner, as a result of which he actually ended up on the margin of music history".

== Biography ==
=== 1875–1906: Youth ===
Richard Wetz was born to a merchant family in Gleiwitz, Upper Silesia (now Poland). Although his family owned a piano, no family member was particularly interested in music. The young Richard, who felt drawn to music early on, did not receive regular piano lessons until the age of eight years, but quickly taught himself by composing smaller piano and song pieces. He later stated that he resolved to dedicate his life to music by the age of 13.

After passing his final examinations in 1897, he went to Leipzig to study at the conservatoire under such tutors as Carl Reinecke and Salomon Jadassohn. After only 6 weeks, however, he discontinued his studies after suffering from disillusionment regarding what he considered overly academic lessons. He instead took private lessons from Richard Hofmann, then leader of the Leipzig music academy, for half a year. At the same time, he took up studies at Leipzig University, including philosophy, psychology and literature. He studied poets such as Friedrich Hölderlin, Heinrich von Kleist and particularly Johann Wolfgang von Goethe, who had great influence on his later work as a composer. Likewise, he became a follower of the philosophical ideas of Arthur Schopenhauer. In the Autumn of 1899, Wetz left Leipzig and moved to Munich, where he began to study music with Ludwig Thuille. Again in 1900, Wetz interrupted his study and moved to Stralsund where Felix Weingartner found him employment as a theatre conductor. After some months he was in the same position in Barmen (now Wuppertal), but only a short time later he found himself again unemployed in Leipzig. Here he educated himself further in music history, also studying scores of classical and modern composers. Anton Bruckner and Franz Liszt became his most important role models.

=== 1906–1935 ===
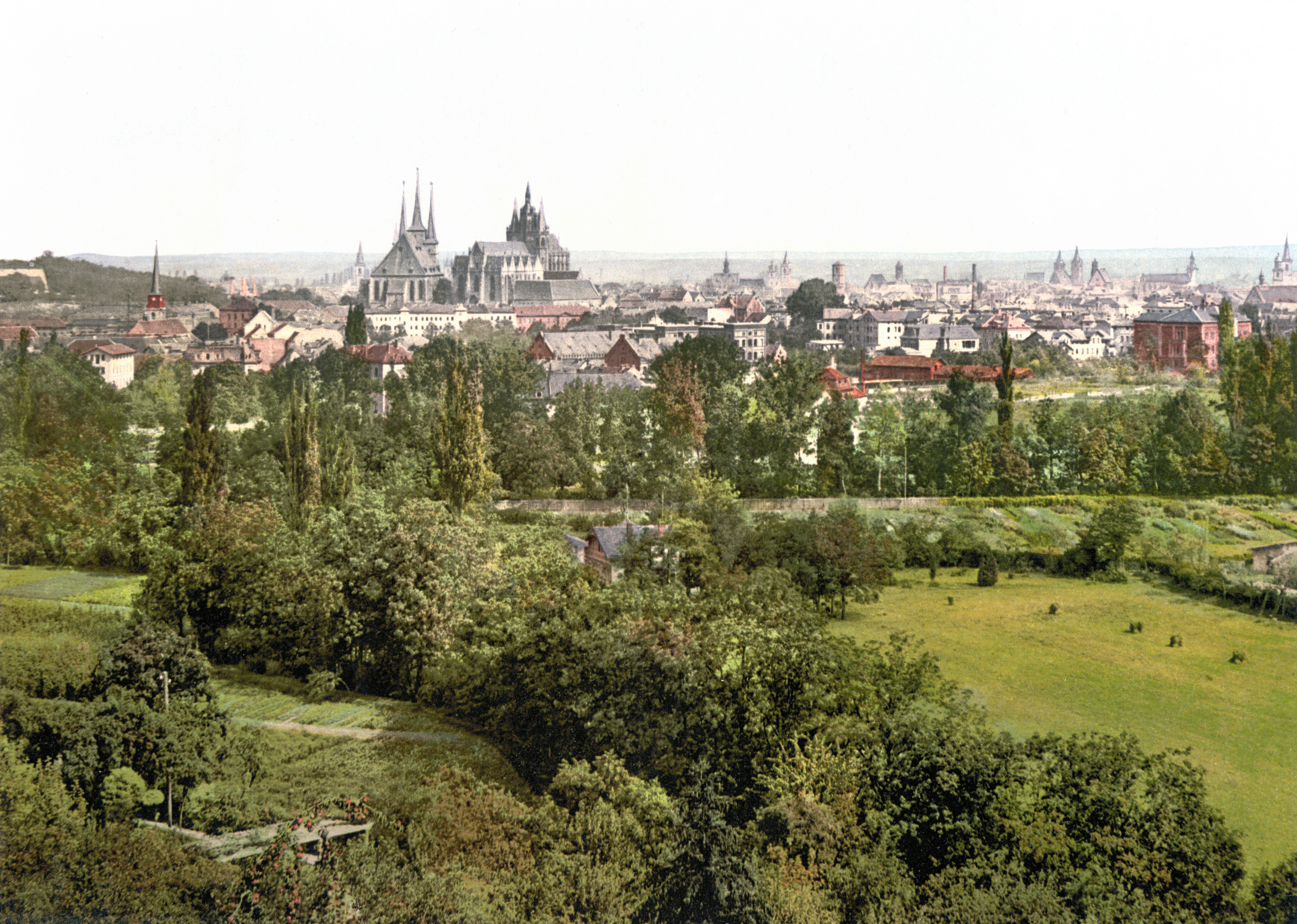
Erfurt in 1900

Wetz was appointed a manager of the Erfurt music association in 1906. He fell in love with the town and remained there for the rest of his life. Until this point, Wetz's published compositional works had almost exclusively been lieder, though he twice tried to write opera. He wrote the librettos for both works, Judith (op. 13) and The Eternal Fire (Op. 19). His one act play, The Eternal Fire, was performed in 1907 in Hamburg and Düsseldorf, but with little success. In 1909 he received a better reception with his Kleist-Ouvertüre (Op. 16) which Arthur Nikisch conducted in Leipzig.

Wetz c. 1905

During the following years, Wetz devoted himself to the music profession. He gave lessons in the Erfurt city conservatoire (in 1911–1921, composition and history of music), and honed his skills in conducting various choirs (the Erfurt Song Academy in 1914/15, the "Riedelscher Gesangverein" in Leipzig, and after 1918, the "Engelbrechtscher Madrigalchor"). He also worked in composing choral music, a cappella, and orchestral accompaniments. Some of the most notable works of the period were the Song of Life (Op. 29), Hyperion (O. 32) (to texts by Friedrich Hölderlin) and a setting of Psalm 3 (Op. 37). However, his mature style had not yet fully developed. In 1917, Wetz become a lecturer (assistant professor), and in 1920 professor, of the history of music and composition to the ducal college for music in Weimar. In 1917 he completed his First Symphony in C minor (Op. 40). The symphonies No. 2 in A major (Op. 47) and No. 3 in B♭ minor (described as B♭ major, Op. 48) followed in 1919 and 1922.

In parallel, Wetz worked on his two string quartets in F minor (Op. 43) and E minor (Op. 49). Afterwards, he devoted himself to working on choral pieces, the Requiem in B minor (Op. 50) and the Christmas Oratorio on old-German poems (Op. 53). Wetz also wrote monographs about models Anton Bruckner (1922) and Franz Liszt (1925) as well as Ludwig van Beethoven (1927).

In the mid-1920s the composer organized and led in Erfurt numerous music parties in which he performed his own works. He resigned the formal management of the Erfurt music association in 1925, but remained the central figure of the musical life of the city. In 1928 Wetz and Igor Stravinsky were appointed foreign members of the Prussian Academy of the Arts. A short time later Wetz was called to the Berlin College of Music where he rose to be one of the most successful composition teachers. He left, however, in favor of his posts in Erfurt and Weimar. During the last years of his life, the work at the Weimar college of music increasingly took up his time. Nevertheless, he managed to produce further compositions. As his last great work, in 1933 he completed his violin concerto in B minor (Op. 57). In 1934, the town appointed him the music representative of the city of Erfurt.

In October of that year, Wetz was diagnosed with lung cancer, brought about by excessive smoking. Although strongly impaired, the composer continued with unbroken creative urge, working on the outlines of an oratorio, Love, Life, Eternity after the texts of Goethe, which he wanted to be a monument to his favorite poet. The work, however, was left unfinished on his death. A fourth symphony was also left in a fragmentary state, and a third string quartet was also found incomplete amongst his papers. Richard Wetz died on 16 January 1935 in Erfurt, at age 59. According to his will the fragments of the Goethe oratorio were to be completed by the composer Werner Trenkner, who Wetz considered his greatest pupil. Trenkner failed at completing the work due to civil disputes, and the sketches have since been lost.

== Reception ==
My music’s fate is strange: where it is heard, it stirs people most deeply; but it is rarely given the opportunity.

~ Richard Wetz, 1932

During Wetz's lifetime, his works remained little known outside the circle of his devotees and music-lovers in his home region, to the point that he became nearly unknown after his death. Since that time, his compositions have continued to draw few fans despite the eagerness of his enthusiasts and his reputation as a great music pedagogue. Politically, Wetz made decisions towards the end of his life that may have had an effect on his standing after his death: after the end of the First World War, he became a confessed nationalist who saw the position of his vanquished Germany as a humiliation and longed for resurgence of national greatness, which seemed possible to him in 1933 with the seizure of power by the National Socialists (the Nazis). In May of that same year he enrolled into the Nazi Party and took over the leadership of the music department of the Erfurt branch of the Kampfbund für deutsche Kultur, where he hoped he could thereby gain the goodwill and the support of the Nazi rulers. This, however, had little influence on his ability to spread his work, leaving him the role of composing primarily propaganda pieces.

His most significant interpreter was the conductor Peter Raabe, who performed for the first time all of the Wetz symphonies, and was appointed shortly after Wetz's death in 1935 to be the chairman of the imperial music hall. It was Raabe who founded a Richard Wetz society in 1943 in Gleiwitz. Raabe's work remained greatly hampered, however, by the Second World War. In the post-war period, Wetz's reputation suffered from his identification with National Socialist ideology, as well as the rapid developments of contemporary music at that time which had passed over the tradition-conscious late romantic.

The fact that Wetz had preferred the life in provincial Erfurt to that of the real music metropolises, and that he was never moved to create popular compositions which could have increased his reputation, did little to bring Wetz and his works to the broader general public. Indeed, some conductors questioned the quality of his compositions until the 1990s (especially during the arrangements for celebrations in his honour in Erfurt in 1955, 20th anniversary of his death and what would be his 80th birthday). Only recently have his creations been rediscovered. For example, the composer’s Requiem was performed for the first time in sixty years in September 2003 at the Erfurt church's music festival, under the direction of George Alexander Albrecht.

== Style ==
If one considers the life of Richard Wetz, it is not surprising that in the 1929 Riemann Music Encyclopedia he was stated to have "arranged to be a loner". His stature was less than other composers of the time and the new achievements of contemporaries such as Arnold Schoenberg, Maurice Ravel or Franz Schreker left him behind. Increasingly, the accepted cultural pessimism violently railed against the kind of music that Wetz was writing. Wetz was more related in attitude with such keepers of 19th century tradition such as Sergei Rachmaninoff, Hans Pfitzner and Franz Schmidt, than his contemporaries.

According to his own statements, he depended on familiar surroundings for his composition: "I can compose only with myself at home. Neither on a summer holiday nor during longer vacations I have ever created anything". Statements like this explain why Wetz began to devote himself increasingly to the composition of symphonies and larger choral works only when he settled in Erfurt, but also why he later refused all offers for more lucrative positions and commissions. The seclusion – bordering on isolation – from the mainstream of the German music scene of the past allowed Wetz to concentrate completely upon the development of his own personal style.

Wetz wrote only vocal works in his early days. He often returned to this style until his dying days, which explains why this is the largest part of his output. Wetz counts as one of the most important song composers of his generation. The authorities in this field that Wetz looked to were Franz Schubert, Franz Liszt, Peter Cornelius and Hugo Wolf. Liszt, especially, strongly influenced the tonal patterns of Wetz's early work, although even then Wetz was already forging his own path. This creative period culminates in two operas and Kleist-Ouvertüre, an orchestral work inspired by the tragic destiny of the poet.

From the beginning of Wetz's Erfurt years, his choral works moved away from Liszt's influence bit by bit and Anton Bruckner began to influence the composer. His striving to imitate Bruckner's tonal language shows in the fact that no stylistic break arises between these compositions and earlier works. Wetz learned even more from Bruckner, his clear form structures and the sense of an organic growth of the music without it being overwhelming. Nevertheless, a large measure due to Bruckner, he typically composed powerful and ceremonious effects without stylistic peculiarities.

Wetz's three symphonies are powerful, introverted works in the style of late romantic symphonic music being cultivated at the time, yet his works show their own distinct personalities separating them from the tradition. For Wetz, the subdued nature of the closing passages of his works confirm the integrity of these works. The first symphony's end, for instance, begins in the key of C minor (as Bruckner did also) and almost dissolves in a bright major key before, after a recall of earlier music, an austere and minor-mode conclusion not heard in any Bruckner finale (closer to the mood of the conclusions to some Bruckner opening movements) comes around. This was certainly influenced by the spirit of the times in which he lived, which were certainly not typical. His quartets follow the same techniques in form and gesture as his symphonies, but these were invested with substantially more intense feeling than the more public symphonies.

In his later works, Richard Wetz increasingly refined his style. He began to use chromatic harmonies in even stronger measure in his tonal language. A change to a more polyphonic style already apparent in the string quartets becomes apparent in other works, most notably in the organ piece Passacaglia and Fugue (Op. 55) of 1930). After that point, the influence of Bruckner drops away. In his masterpieces, the requiem and the Christmas oratorio, Wetz discovers a synthesis of symphonic and vocal music in which he summarizes his accumulated musical experience. The violin concerto shows what is probably the most daring formal arrangement in the whole output of the composer and is comparable to the similar violin concerto by Pfitzner, written in the same key (B minor). Although illness and death took Wetz prematurely, he remains nevertheless "One of the great and unmistakable talents of German late romanticism".

== Works ==
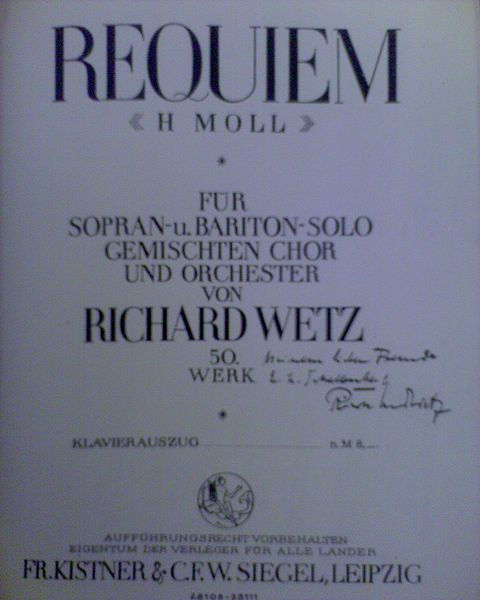
Title page of the Requiem in B minor

The list of works of Richard Wetz contains 58 Opuses, in addition there are a small number of compositions which were published without numbering. Op. 1–4 and Op. 6 are not considered discoverable any longer, and the composer declared some other early works provided with opus figures as invalid.

Opera

- Judith, Op. 13 (3 acts; libretto: Richard Wetz)
- Das ewige Feuer (The eternal fire), Op. 19 (1 act; libretto: Richard Wetz. 1904; published 1905, premiered 1907)

Choir works

- Traumsommernacht (Summernight's dream), Op. 14, for women's choir and orchestra (pub. Kistner, 1912)
  (recording: Augsburg college of music chamber choir, Rhineland-Palatinate State Philharmonic, Werner Andreas Albert, 2004)
- Gesang des Lebens (Song of Life), Op. 29, for boys' choir and orchestra (pub. Kistner, 1910)
  (recording: Rhineland-Palatinate State Philharmonic and State Youth Choir, Werner Andreas Albert, 2001)
- Chorlied aus Oedipus auf Colonos "Nicht geboren ist das Beste" (Choral song from Oedipus on Colonos: "Not born is the best"), Op. 31, for mixed choir and orchestra (after Sophocles) (pub. Kistner, 1912)
- Hyperion, Op. 32, for baritone, mixed choir and orchestra (after Hölderlin), vocal score published by Kistner, 1912
  (recording: Markus Köhler, Augsburg college of music chamber choir, Rhineland-Palatinate State Philharmonic, Werner Andreas Albert, 2004)
- Der dritte Psalm (Psalm 3), Op. 37, for baritone, mixed choir and orchestra
- Four sacred songs (Kyrie, Et incarnatus est, Crucifixus, Agnus Dei), Op. 44, for choir a cappella
- Kreuzfahrerlied (Crusader song), Op. 46, for mixed choir (after Hartmann von Aue) (published 1910)
- Requiem in B minor, Op. 50, for soprano, baritone, mixed choir and orchestra (pub. 1925)
  (recording: Marietta Zumbült, Mario Hoff, Erfurt Cathedral Choir, Weimar Philharmonic Choir, Thuringian Weimar State Orchestra, George Alexander Albrecht, CPO 2003.)
- Ein Weihnachts-Oratorium auf alt-deutsche Gedichte (A Christmas oratorio on old-German poems), Op. 53, for soprano, baritone, mixed choir and orchestra
- Drei Weihnachtsmotetten, Op. 58, for mixed choir a cappella
- Liebe, Leben, Ewigkeit (Love, life, eternity), oratorio fragment (after Goethe), lost

Orchestral works

- Kleist-Ouvertüre in D minor, Op. 16 (Kistner, 1908)

(Recording: Rhineland-Palatinate State Philharmonic, Werner Andreas Albert, CPO 1999)

- Symphony No. 1 in C minor, Op. 40 (pub. Simrock, 1924)

(Recording: Kraków Philharmonic Orchestra, Roland Bader, CPO 1994)

- Symphony No. 2 in A major, Op. 47 (pub. 1921)

(Recording: Rhineland-Palatinate State Philharmonic, Werner Andreas Albert, CPO 1999)

- Symphony No. 3 in B♭ minor, Op. 48

(Recordings: Rhineland-Palatinate State Philharmonic, Werner Andreas Albert, CPO 2001)
(Konzerthausorchester Berlin, Erich Peter, 1981, Sterling)

- Violin Concerto in B minor, Op. 57 (pub. 1933)

(Recording: Ulf Wallin (Violin), Rhineland-Palatinate State Philharmonic, Werner Andreas Albert, CPO 2003)

Chamber music

- Sonata for solo violin in G major, Op. 33 (Kistner, 1913)
- String Quartet No. 1 in F minor, Op. 43 (Kistner, 1918)
- String Quartet No. 2 in E minor, Op. 49 (Simrock, 1924)

Organ music

- Passacaglia and Fugue in D minor, Op. 55 (pub. 1930)
  (recording: "Wachet auf, ruft uns die Stimme", Silvius von Kessel, 2000, Motette)
  (recording: "Orgelland Niederlausitz Vol. 1", Lothar Knappe, 2003, H'ART)
- Kleine Toccata in E minor

Piano music

- Romantische Variationen über ein Originalthema (Romantic variations on an original theme), Op. 42 (published 1917)

Songs

over 100 songs for voice and piano, including:

- Op. 5, 6 Lieder für eine mittlere Singstimme mit Begleitung des Klaviers., a set published in 1901, including "Wiegenlied" (Cradle song), No. 3
- Die Muschel (The shell), Op. 9/2 (poem by Richard Schaukal. Published 1904)
- Op. 10, Five songs for soprano and piano
- Op. 15. Six songs for mezzo-soprano and piano
- Op. 20. Five songs for baritone or mezzo-soprano and piano
- Op. 21. Five songs for mezzo-soprano and piano
- Op. 22. Five songs for soprano or mezzo-soprano and piano

also some songs with orchestral accompaniment, including

- Op. 51. Two songs for voice and small orchestra (published 1929 by Greiner & Pfeiffer).

Writings

- Anton Bruckner. Sein Leben und Schaffen (Anton Bruckner. His life and work), 1922
- Franz Liszt, pub. Leipzig: Reclam, 1925
- Beethoven. Die geistigen Grundlagen seines Schaffens (Beethoven. The spiritual foundation of his work), 1927
