= Niedersächsisches Staatsorchester Hannover =

German symphony orchestra

The Hanover State Symphony Orchestra (German: Niedersächsisches Staatsorchester Hannover) is based in Hanover, the state capital of Lower Saxony, Germany. It serves as the orchestra of the Hanover State Opera (Staatsoper Hannover), and primarily performs its symphony concerts at Hanover Opera House (Opernhaus Hannover).

== History ==
George, Duke of Brunswick-Calenberg established the precursor ensemble to the orchestra as his court orchestra (Hofkapelle) in 1636. In 1852, this ensemble became established in the city of Hanover. Since 1 January 1970, the orchestra has been part of Hanover State Theatre of Lower Saxony (Niedersächsisches Staatstheater Hannover). As of 2020, its roster numbers 105 members.

The longest-serving general music director (Generalmusikdirektor) of the orchestra was George Alexander Albrecht from 1965 to 1993. Karen Kamensek was the first woman, and first American, in this position, from 2011 to 2016. In January 2020, Stephan Zilias first guest-conducted the orchestra in a symphony concert, following his earlier guest-conducting debut with the Hanover State Opera in the 2019–2020 season. In February 2020, the orchestra announced the appointment of Zilias as its next general music director, effective with the 2020–2021 season.

== General music directors ==
- Johannes Schüler (1949–1960)
- Günther Wich (1961–1965)
- George Alexander Albrecht (1965–1993)
- Christof Perick (1993–1996)
- Andreas Delfs (1995–2000)
- Hans Urbanek (2000/2001)
- Lü Shao-chia (2001–2006)
- Wolfgang Bozic (2006–2011)
- Karen Kamensek (2011–2016)
- Ivan Repušić (2016–2019)
- Stephan Zilias (2020–2026)
- Francesco Angelico (2026–)
