= Siri Thornhill =

Norwegian classical soprano

- Other names: Siri Karoline Thornhill
- Occupation: Classical soprano

Siri Karoline Thornhill is a Norwegian classical soprano for concert and opera, known for singing music of Johann Sebastian Bach.

== Career ==
Thornhill studied singing first in her hometown Stavanger with Marit Storækre and continued with a scholarship from the Norwegian government at the Royal Conservatory in The Hague with Marius van Altena, Rita Dams and Diane Forlano. She took master-classes with Cristina Deutekom, Elly Ameling, Ton Koopman, Beata Heuer-Christen, Anna Reynolds and Jean Cox.

Thornhill has recorded Bach cantatas with Sigiswald Kuijken and La Petite Bande, the soloists also forming the choir. With them she performed among other cantatas Bach's cantata for the fourth Sunday after Trinity, Ich ruf zu dir, Herr Jesu Christ, BWV 177, at the Rheingau Musik Festival in the Eibingen Abbey. She appeared in Antonio Lotti's Requiem with the Thomas Hengelbrock's Balthasar-Neumann-Chor, and in Handel's Messiah with the Knabenchor Hannover conducted by Jörg Breiding. She recorded in 2001 Ein deutsches Requiem with Klaus Mertens and the choir of the Bremen Cathedral, conducted by Wolfgang Helbich. She took part in two world-premiere recordings with dramatic church music by Simon Mayr for Naxos, such as Jacob a Labano fugiens and in 2013 his reconstructed Requiem.

She has collaborated with the Camerata Köln and the Amsterdam Baroque Orchestra & Choir in the project Dieterich Buxtehude – Opera Omnia. In 2009 she recorded the Bach solo cantatas for soprano with the Cologne Chamber Orchestra and the Cologne Bach Chorus, conducted by Helmut Müller-Brühl, reviewed by George Chien:

"The present disc reveals an appealing vocal quality—clean, agile, superbly controlled, secure throughout the range—serving an appropriate understanding of the texts."

Thornhill has sung Baroque opera roles, such as Clomiri in Handel's Imeneo with the Capella Augustina conducted by Andreas Spering at the Halle Opera House, in Rameau's Dardanus in Freiburg, in carnival music from Venice and Florence with Hengelbrock at the Komische Oper Berlin, in Alessandro Stradella's San Giovanni Battista at the Quedlinburg Cathedral, and in Reinhard Keiser's Sieg der fruchtbaren Pomona. In August 2006 she made her debut as Donna Anna in Mozart's Don Giovanni with Kuijken at the Festival de l'Opera in Beaune and the Bruges Early Music Festival. She has also appeared in opera premieres of the 20th and 21st century such as Odysseus's Women of Louis Andriessen in Rotterdam and Amsterdam.

She has appeared at international festivals such as the Handel Festival Halle, the Handel Festival Göttingen and the Lucerne Festival.
