= Coloratura soprano =

Type of singing voice

A coloratura soprano (Italian: soprano di coloratura) is a type of operatic soprano voice that specializes in music that is distinguished by agile runs, leaps and trills.

The term coloratura refers to the elaborate ornamentation of a melody, which is a typical component of the music written for this voice. Within the coloratura category, there are roles written specifically for lighter voices known as lyric coloraturas and others for larger voices known as dramatic coloraturas. Categories within a certain vocal range are determined by the size, weight and color of the voice. Coloratura is particularly found in vocal music and especially in operatic singing of the 18th and 19th centuries.

Today, coloratura sopranos are sometimes classified more specific as either light lyric coloratura sopranos, full lyric coloratura sopranos, light dramatic coloratura sopranos or full dramatic coloratura sopranos.

== Lyric coloratura soprano ==
A very agile light voice with a high upper extension, capable of fast vocal coloratura. Lyric coloraturas have a range of approximately middle C (C_{4}) to "high F" (F_{6}). Such a soprano is sometimes referred to as a soprano leggero if her vocal timbre has a slightly warmer quality. The soprano leggero also typically does not go as high as other coloraturas, peaking at a "high E" (E_{6}). Bel canto roles were typically written for this voice, and a wide variety of other composers have also written coloratura parts. Baroque music, early music and baroque opera also have many roles for this voice.

=== Lyric coloratura soprano roles ===
- Adele, Die Fledermaus (Johann Strauss)
- Adina, L'elisir d'amore (Donizetti)
- Agrippina, Agrippina (Handel)
- Alcina, Alcina (Handel)
- Almirena, Rinaldo (Handel)
- Alzira, Alzira (Verdi)
- Amenaide, Tancredi (Rossini)
- Amina, La sonnambula (Bellini)
- Angelica, Orlando (Handel)
- Ariel, The Tempest (Thomas Adès)
- Aspasia, Mitridate, re di Ponto (Mozart)
- Bianca, Bianca e Fernando (Bellini)
- Blonde, Die Entführung aus dem Serail (Mozart)
- Bystrouška, The Cunning Little Vixen (Janáček)
- Carolina, Il matrimonio segreto (Cimarosa)
- Celia, Lucio Silla (Mozart)
- Cleopatra, Giulio Cesare (George Frideric Handel)
- La Comtesse Adèle, Le comte Ory (Rossini)
- Cunegonde, Candide (Bernstein)
- Dalinda, Ariodante (Handel)
- Dinorah, Le pardon de Ploërmel (Giacomo Meyerbeer)
- Dorinda, Orlando (Handel)
- Elisa, Il re pastore (Mozart)
- Elizabeth Doe, The Ballad of Baby Doe (Douglas Moore)
- Elvira, I puritani (Bellini)
- Elvira, L'italiana in Algeri (Rossini)
- Eurydice, Orpheus in the Underworld (Offenbach)
- Fatime, Abu Hassan (Weber)
- La Fée, Cendrillon (Massenet)
- Le feu/La princesse/Le rossignol, L'enfant et les sortilèges (Ravel)
- Fiakermilli, Arabella (Richard Strauss)
- Frasquita, Carmen (Bizet)
- Freia, Der Ring des Nibelungen (Wagner)
- Gilda, Rigoletto (Verdi)
- Giulietta, I Capuleti e i Montecchi (Bellini)
- Ilia, Idomeneo (Mozart)
- Inès, L'Africaine (Giacomo Meyerbeer)
- Ismene, Mitridate, re di Ponto (Mozart)
- Isotta, Die schweigsame Frau (Richard Strauss)
- Juliette, Roméo et Juliette (Gounod)
- Lakmé, Lakmé (Delibes)
- Léïla, Les pêcheurs de perles (Bizet)
- Leticia, The Exterminating Angel (opera) (Adès)
- Linda di Chamounix, Linda di Chamounix (Donizetti)
- Lisa, La sonnambula (Bellini)
- Lucy, The Telephone (Menotti)
- Mabel, The Pirates of Penzance (Sullivan)
- Madame Herz, Der Schauspieldirektor (Mozart)
- Madame Silberklang, Der Schauspieldirektor (Mozart)
- Madame Mao, Nixon in China (John Adams)
- Marguérite, Faust (Charles Gounod)
- Marie, La fille du régiment (Donizetti)
- Moll Hackabout, A Harlot's Progress (Iain Bell)
- Morgana, Alcina (Handel)
- Nachtigall, Die Vögel (Walter Braunfels)
- The Nightingale, The Nightingale (Stravinsky)
- Norina, Don Pasquale (Donizetti)
- Olympia, The Tales of Hoffmann (Offenbach)
- Ophélie, Hamlet (Ambroise Thomas)
- Oscar, Un ballo in maschera (Verdi) – trouser role
- Philine, Mignon (Ambroise Thomas)
- Philomele, The Love of the Nightingale (Richard Mills)
- The Queen, Perelà, uomo di fumo (Dusapin)
- The Queen of Chemakha, The Golden Cockerel (Nikolai Rimsky-Korsakov)
- Rosina, (in the Soprano key) The Barber of Seville (Rossini)
- Silvia, Ascanio in Alba (Mozart)
- Tamyris, Il re pastore (Mozart)
- Tinti, Massimilla Doni (Schoeck)
- Tytania, A Midsummer Night's Dream (Britten)
- Undine, Undine (Lortzing)
- Venus, Ascanio in Alba (Mozart)
- Waldvogel, Der Ring des Nibelungen (Wagner)
- Zemire, Zémire et Azor (Grétry)
- Zerbinetta, Ariadne auf Naxos (Richard Strauss)

== Dramatic coloratura soprano ==
A coloratura soprano with great flexibility in high-lying velocity passages, yet with great sustaining power comparable to that of a full spinto or dramatic soprano. Dramatic coloraturas have a range of approximately "low A" (A_{3}) to "high F" (F_{6}). Various dramatic coloratura roles have different vocal demands for the singer – for instance, the voice that can sing Abigail (Nabucco, Verdi) is unlikely to also sing Lucia (Lucia di Lammermoor, Donizetti), but a factor in common is that the voice must be able to convey dramatic intensity as well as flexibility. Roles written specifically for this kind of voice include the more dramatic Mozart and bel canto female roles and early Verdi. This is a rare vocal fach, as thick vocal cords are needed to produce the large, dramatic notes, which usually lessens the flexibility and acrobatic abilities of the voice.

One must not mistake the Mozartian dramatic coloratura soprano with the Italian dramatic coloratura soprano. A singer that sings Konstanze, Donna Anna or Fiordiligi can not necessarily sing the Italian dramatic coloratura parts, due to other vocal demands. Imogene, Leonora and Violetta require a dramatic soprano voice and are most often sung by dramatic sopranos with an agile voice that can easily produce coloratura and high notes. Roles like Norma, Lady Macbeth, Odabella or Abigaille are good examples of Italian roles that are not necessarily a coloratura soprano (even though the score calls for coloratura singing), but a full bodied dramatic soprano with a voice that can handle extreme dramatic singing and that is flexible enough to sing coloratura. Giuseppe Verdi wrote many parts like this in his early years.

=== Dramatic coloratura soprano roles ===
- Abigaille, Nabucco (Verdi)
- Alaide, La straniera (Bellini)
- Amalia, I masnadieri (Verdi)
- Aminta, Die schweigsame Frau (Richard Strauss)
- Anne, The Rake's Progress (Stravinsky)
- Anna Bolena, Anna Bolena (Donizetti)
- Armida, Rinaldo (Handel)
- Armida, Armida (Rossini)
- Bertalda, Undine (Lortzing)
- Chief of the Secret Police Gepopo, Le Grand Macabre (Ligeti)
- Donna Anna, Don Giovanni (Mozart)
- Elettra, Idomeneo (Mozart)
- Elena, La donna del lago (Rossini)
- Elisabetta, Maria Stuarda, Roberto Devereux (Donizetti)
- Elvira, Ernani (Verdi)
- Empress, Die Frau ohne Schatten (R. Strauss)
- Esclarmonde, Esclarmonde (Massenet)
- Europa, Europa riconosciuta (Salieri)
- Fauno, Ascanio in Alba (Mozart) – trouser role
- Fiordiligi, Così fan tutte (Mozart)
- Giovanna, Giovanna d'Arco (Verdi)
- Giulietta, I Capuleti e i Montecchi (Bellini)
- Giunia, Lucio Silla (Mozart)
- Hélène, Jérusalem (Verdi)
- Imogene, Il pirata (Bellini)
- Konstanze, Die Entführung aus dem Serail (Mozart)
- Lady Macbeth, Macbeth (Verdi)
- Leonora, Il trovatore (Verdi)
- Lida, La battaglia di Legnano (Verdi)
- Lina, Stiffelio (Verdi)
- Lucia, Lucia di Lammermoor (Donizetti)
- Lucrezia, Lucrezia Borgia (Donizetti)
- Lucrezia, I due Foscari (Verdi)
- Luisa Miller, Luisa Miller (Verdi)
- Marchesa del Poggio, Un giorno di regno (Verdi)
- Marguérite, Faust (Gounod)
- Marguérite de Valois, Les Huguenots (Meyerbeer)
- Maria Stuarda, Maria Stuarda (Donizetti)
- Mathilde, William Tell (Rossini)
- Medora, Il corsaro (Verdi)
- Norma, Norma (Bellini)
- Odabella, Attila (Verdi)
- Poppea, L'incoronazione di Poppea (Monteverdi)
- Queen of the Night, Die Zauberflöte (Mozart)
- Rodelinda, Rodelinda (Handel)
- Rosalinde, Die Fledermaus (Johann Strauss)
- Die Schneekönigin, Die Schneekönigin (Albrecht)
- Semiramide, Semiramide (Rossini)
- Thaïs, Thaïs (Massenet)
- Violetta, La traviata (Verdi)
- Vitellia, La clemenza di Tito (Mozart)
- Woglinde, Der Ring des Nibelungen (Wagner)

== Soprano acuto sfogato ==
In rare instances, some coloratura sopranos are able to sing in altissimo above high F (F_{6}). This type of singer is sometimes referred to as a soprano acuto sfogato.

Although both lyric and dramatic coloraturas can be acuto sfogato sopranos, the primary attribute of the acuto sfogato soprano is an upper extension above F_{6}. Some pedagogues refer to these extreme high notes as the whistle register.

Very few composers have ever written operatic roles for this voice type with actual notes scored above high F, so these singers typically display these extreme high notes through the use of interpolation in some of the operatic roles already cited above or in concert works. Examples of works that include G_{6} are the concert aria Popoli di Tessaglia! by Mozart, Esclarmonde by Massenet, and Postcard from Morocco by Dominick Argento. Thomas Adès composed a high A (A_{6}) for the character of Leticia Meynar in The Exterminating Angel.

The soprano acuto sfogato is sometimes confused with the soprano sfogato, a singer (often mezzo-soprano) capable, by sheer industry or natural talent, of extending her upper range to encompass some of the coloratura soprano tessitura, though not the highest range above high F.

== See also ==
- Lyric soprano
- Dramatic soprano
- Soubrette
- Spinto soprano
