= Staatsoper Hannover =

Opera company in Hanover, Germany

Hanover State Opera
- Native name: Staatsoper Hannover
- Traded as: Niedersächsische Staatstheater Hannover GmbH
- Founded: 1851
- Headquarters: Germany
- Key people: Bodo Busse; Stephan Zilias
- Parent: Hanover State Theatre
- Building details
- Opernhaus Hannover
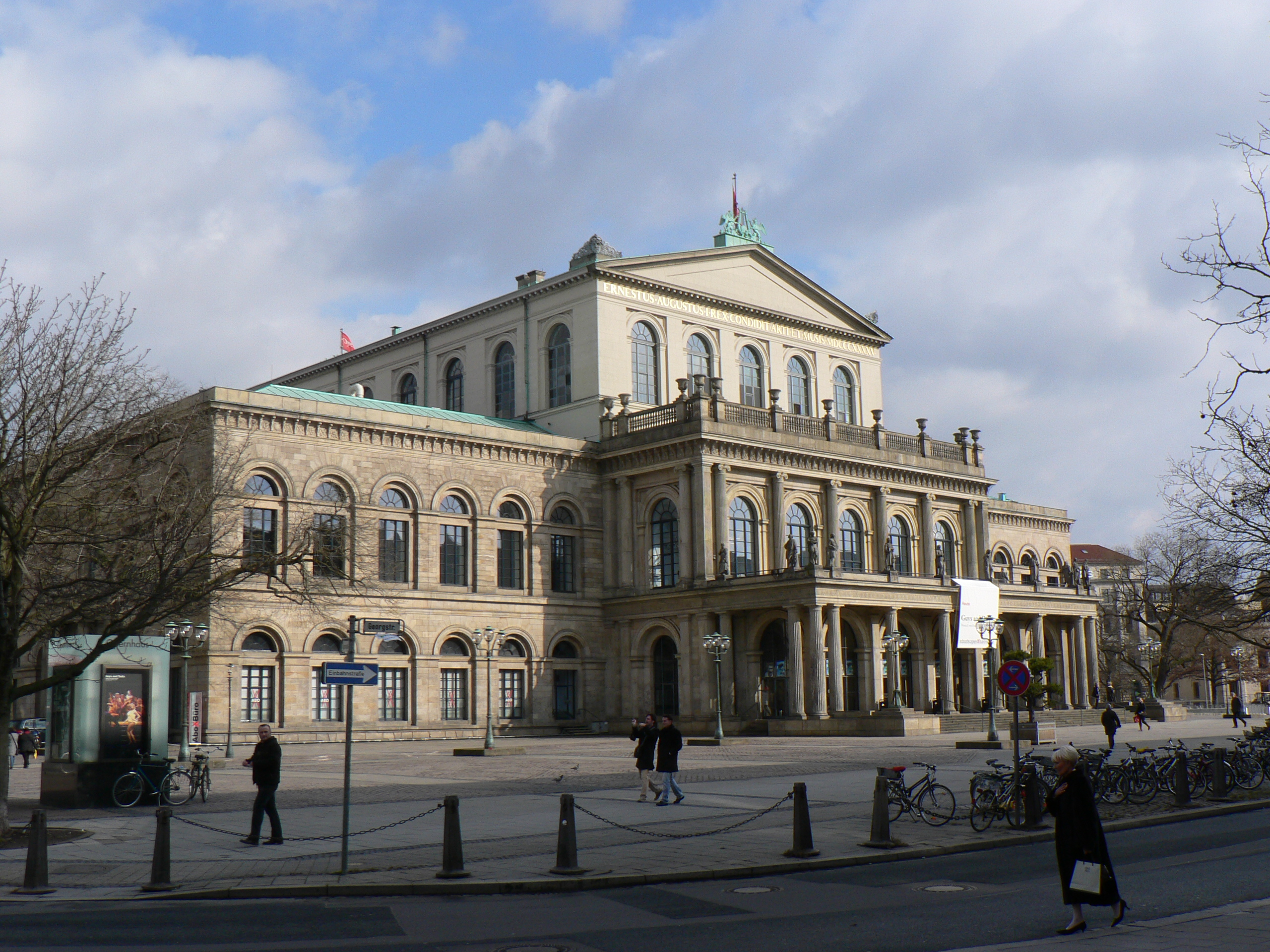
- The opera company is resident in Hanover Opera House, seen here from the northwest.

General information
- Location: Opernplatz 1, Hanover, Lower Saxony, Germany
- Coordinates: 52°22′24″N 9°44′27″E
- Opened: 1852; 174 years ago
- Renovated: 1948–1950; 1985; 1996–1998

Design and construction
- Architect: Georg Ludwig Friedrich Laves
- Website: staatstheater-hannover.de

Hanover State Opera (German: Staatsoper Hannover) is a German opera company based in Hanover, the state capital of Lower Saxony. The company is resident in the Hanover Opera House (Opernhaus Hannover), and is part of a publicly-funded umbrella performing arts organisation called Hanover State Theatre of Lower Saxony (Niedersächsisches Staatstheater Hannover), or simply Hanover State Theatre (Staatstheater Hannover).

Hanover State Theatre comprises the following divisions that put on operas, stage productions, and concert programs, in addition to maintaining a theatre museum, with seasons running from September through to June.

1. Hanover Drama (Schauspiel Hannover)
2. Hanover State Opera
3. Hanover State Ballet (Staatsballett Hannover)
4. Hanover State Symphony Orchestra (Staatsorchester Hannover)
5. Hanover Theatre Museum (Theatermuseum Hannover)

== Hanover Opera House ==
Hanover State Opera is resident in the Hanover Opera House, built in classical style between 1845 and 1852 based on a plan by Georg Ludwig Friedrich Laves. The building was rebuilt from 1948 after being badly damaged by the aerial bombings of Hanover during World War II. In 1985, the acoustics were improved, and between 1996 and 1998, the stage facilities were renovated.

The International Choreographic Competition Hannover has taken place at Hanover Opera House since the early 1980s, and is the longest-running choreography competition in the world. It is organised by the Ballet Association of Hanover (Ballett Gesellschaft Hannover).

== Administration ==
The intendant of the opera company is Bodo Busse.

The longest-serving general music director (GMD) of the opera company was George Alexander Albrecht, from 1965 until 1993. The first woman, and first American, to hold the post of general music director was Karen Kamensek, from 2011 until 2014. The current GMD of the opera company is Stephan Zilias, named to the post in February 2020 following his debut with the opera company in the 2019–2020 season. In April 2024 the company announced the extension of Zilias' contract as GMD through the 2025–2026 season.

== General music directors ==
- 1924–1943: Rudolf Krasselt
- 1945–1949: Franz Konwitschny
- 1949–1960: Johannes Schüler
- 1961–1965: Günter Wich
- 1965–1993: George Alexander Albrecht
- 1993–1996: Christof Perick
- 1996–2000: Andreas Delfs
- 2000–2001: Hans Urbanek
- 2001–2006: Lü Shao-chia
- 2006–2011: Wolfgang Bozic
- 2011–2016: Karen Kamensek
- 2016–2019: Ivan Repušić
- 2020–2026: Stephan Zilias
- 2026–present: Francesco Angelico

== Premieres ==
- 1838: Der Bäbu by Heinrich Marschner (performance took place in the old Schlossopernhaus)
- 1852: Austin by Marschner
- 1921: Die Prinzessin Girnara by Egon Wellesz
- 1931: Prinzessin Brambilla by Walter Braunfels
- 1943: Der Kuckuck von Theben by Ermanno Wolf-Ferrari
- 1952: Boulevard Solitude by Hans Werner Henze
- 1970: Der Aufsichtsrat by Diether de la Motte
- 1977: Faust und Yorick by Wolfgang Rihm
- 1980: Ein Abenteuer auf dem Friedhof by Alfred Koerppen
- 1992: Draußen vor der Tür by Xaver Paul Thoma
- 2000: Gilgamesh by Volker David Kirchner
- 2005: iOPAL by Hans-Joachim Hespos
- 2017: Lot by Giorgio Battistelli

== Notable people ==
- Marco Goecke
