= Maxime Pascal =

French conductor (born 1985)

Maxime Pascal (born 9 September 1985 in Nantes, France) is a French conductor.

== Biography ==
Born to musician parents, a jazz trombonist father and a pianist mother, Pascal began piano studies with his mother, and subsequently studied violin, in his youth in Carcassonne. In 2005, he began music studies at the Conservatoire national supérieur d'art dramatique in Paris, in composition, musical analysis and orchestration classes. He then developed an interest in conducting, and enrolled in the conducting class of François-Xavier Roth.

In 2008, the ensemble Le Balcon, named after the play by Jean Genet and co-founded by Juan-Pablo Carreño, Mathieu Costecalde, Alphonse Cemin, Florent Derex Pascal, Pedro Garcia-Velasquez and Pascal, gave its first public performance. Also in 2008, Pascal became music director of the Parisian amateur ensemble Orchestre Impromptu, Beginning in 2018, for the ensemble's tenth anniversary, Le Balcon and Pascal have become the first ensemble and conductor to embark on a projected complete cycle of live performances of the complete Licht operas of Karlheinz Stockhausen, one opera per year.

In October 2023, the Helsingborg Symphony Orchestra announced the appointment of Pascal as its next chief conductor, following five guest-conducting appearances with the ensemble. The initial appointment is for three years, effective August 2024. In September 2025, the Helsingborg Symphony Orchestra announced a one-year contract extension for Pascal as its chief conductor, through the 2027-2028 season. Also in September 2025, the Deutsche Oper Berlin announced the appointment of Pascal as co-principal guest conductor, effective in the summer of 2026.

=== Honours and awards ===
Pascal has been in residence at the Singer-Polignac Foundation since September 2010. The Académie des Beaux-Arts awarded him the Simone and Cino del Duca Foundation Music Prize at the Institut de France in November 2011 for the start of his career. Since 2012, Pascal has received support from the Orange Foundation. In March 2014, he was the first Frenchman to win the Nestlé and Salzburg Festival Young Conductors Award.

Cultural offices
Preceded by Stefan Solyom	Principal Conductor, Helsingborg Symphony Orchestra; 2024–present	Succeeded by incumbent
