= Stefan Solyom =

Swedish conductor and composer

Stefan Solyom (born 26 April 1979, in Stockholm) is a Swedish conductor and composer.

== Biography ==
The nephew of the Swedish-Hungarian pianist Janos Solyom, Solyom attended the Adolf Fredrik's Music School in Stockholm. He studied horn and conducting at the Royal College of Music, Stockholm and the Sibelius Academy. His conducting teachers included Jorma Panula and Leif Segerstam. He was a first prize winner in the 1998 Helsingborg Symphony Orchestra conducting competition. Solyom became artistic director of the Nordic Youth Orchestra in Lund in 1999. He was a prizewinner in the 2000 International Sibelius Conducting Competition.

Solyom first conducted the BBC Scottish Symphony Orchestra (BBC SSO) in February 2005, substituting on short notice for another conductor. He subsequently became Associate Guest Conductor of the BBC SSO in May 2006, a position specifically created for him. He stood down from this post in December 2009.

In September 2009, Solyom became Generalmusikdirektor (GMD) of the Deutsches Nationaltheater and Staatskapelle Weimar. His initial contract was for 5 years. He concluded his Weimar tenure in July 2016. With the 2009–2010 season, he also became principal guest conductor of the Norrköping Symphony Orchestra, and held the post until 2013. In March 2013, Solyom was named the next chief conductor of the Helsingborg Symphony Orchestra, as of the 2014–2015 season. He stood down from the Helsingborg post in 2020.

Solyom's commercial recordings include a live recording of Poul Ruders' Fairytale, for Bridge Records. His compositions include a Concert Piece for Drums and Strings.

Solyom is married to violinist Catherine Manoukian. They live in Sweden and Germany.

Cultural offices
Preceded by Carl St.Clair	Generalmusikdirektor, Deutsches Nationaltheater and Staatskapelle Weimar; 2009–2016	Succeeded by Kirill Karabits
Preceded by Andrew Manze	Principal Conductor, Helsingborg Symphony Orchestra; 2014–2020	Succeeded by Maxime Pascal
