= Alfred Koerppen =

German composer and teacher (1926–2022)

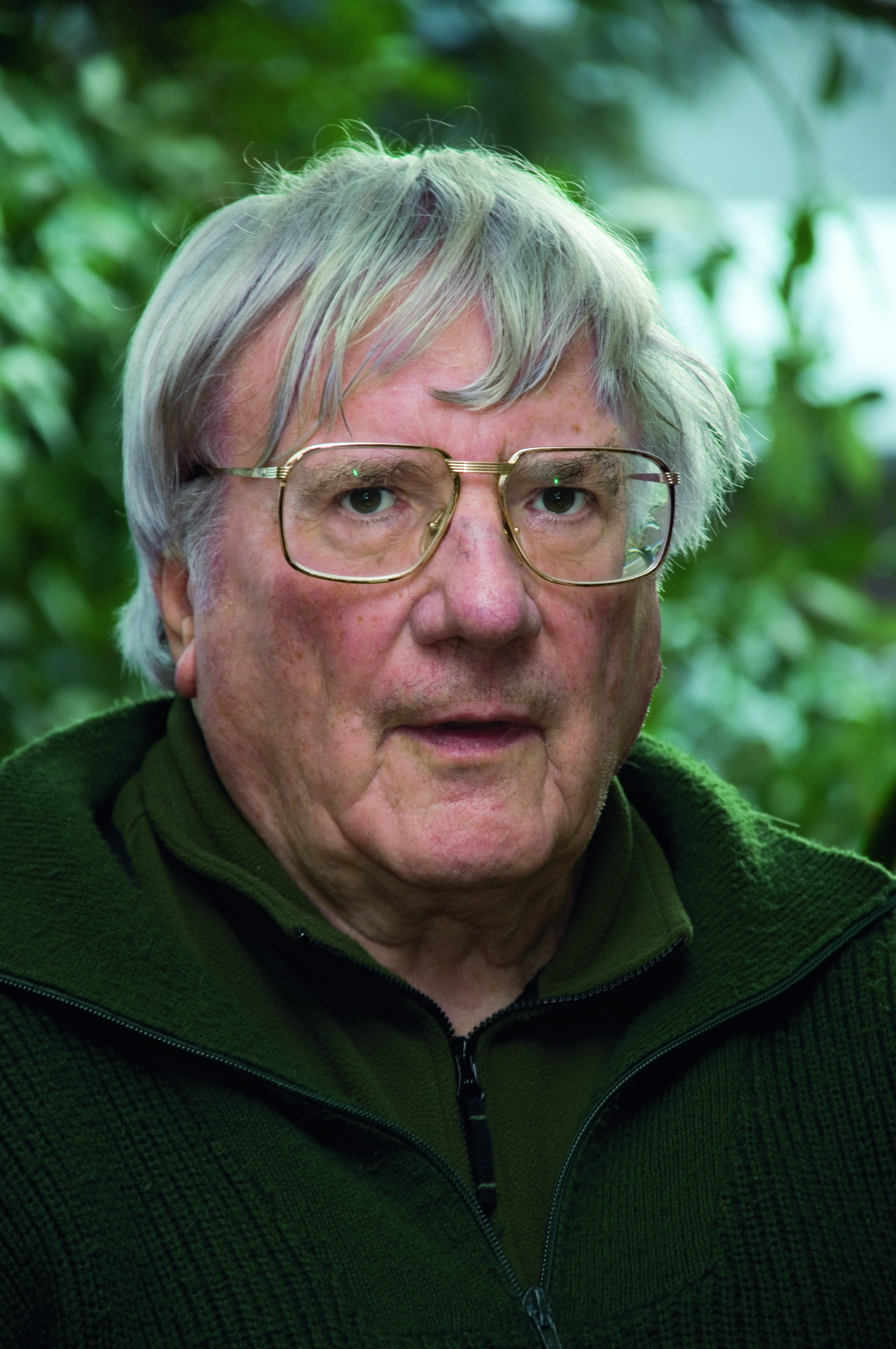
- Koerppen in 2010
- Born: 16 December 1926; Wiesbaden, Germany
- Died: 5 July 2022 (aged 95); Hanover, Germany
- Education: Musisches Gymnasium Frankfurt
- Occupations: Organist; Composer; Academic teacher
- Organisations: Landesmusikschule Hannover; Hochschule für Musik und Theater Hannover
- Spouse: Barbara Koerppen (m. 1960)
- Awards: Villa Massimo; Lower Saxony State Prize; Lower Saxony Order of Merit

Alfred Koerppen (16 December 1926 – 5 July 2022) was a German organist, music pedagogue, composer and academic teacher. He taught composition and music theory at the Hochschule für Musik und Theater Hannover from 1948 to 1991. His compositions focus on choral music with and without accompaniment, but he also wrote symphonies, chamber music and stage works.

== Life ==
Koerppen was born in Wiesbaden on 16 December 1926. His father, August Koerppen, was a conductor, so he became familiar with music early. He received his first music lessons at the age of six. While still at school, he wrote his own compositions. He attended the Musisches Gymnasium Frankfurt for especially musically gifted children from all over Germany, from 1939 to 1945; he was trained in composition and music theory by Kurt Thomas. He studied at the same time as Heinz Hennig, Paul Kuhn, Clytus Gottwald and Siegfried Strohbach.

After World War II, Koerppen initially worked as an organist and music teacher at the Musisches Gymnasium. In 1946, his first works were published and he received commissions for compositions. In 1948, Koerppen became a lecturer at the Landesmusikschule Hannover, (later the Hochschule für Musik und Theater). When the opera house was reopened after restoration, his oratorio Der Turmbau zu Babel was premiered.

Koerppen's opera Virgilius, der Magier von Rom to a libretto by the composer after Virgil was premiered in Frankfurt in 1951, and published by Breitkopf & Härtel in 1953. In 1960, he was granted a one-year scholarship at the Villa Massimo in Rome. In 1967, he was appointed professor of composition and music theory at the Hochschule für Musik und Theater Hannover. Since 1970, he has also been active internationally, teaching for example as a visiting professor at the Shanghai Academy of Music. In 1983, Koerppen received the Lower Saxony State Prize for culture. He retired from teaching in 1991, having educated many students who became notable composers, conductors, church musicians and pedagogues. Koerppen wrote his last work, a cantata In Paradisum (To paradise) to the text from the Requiem, in 2021 at age 94. It was premiered in the Stadthaus Burgdorf in September 2021.

In 1960, Koerppen married the violinist Barbara Koerppen, née Boehr. They lived in Burgdorf. Together, they founded in 2002 the Alfred Koerppen Stiftung, a foundation towards the creation, publication and performance of new classical music.

Koerppen died on 5 July 2022, at the age of 95, at the hospital of the Medizinische Hochschule Hannover after a brief serious illness.

== Work ==
Koerppen's works are published by Breitkopf & Härtel, Möseler Verlag, Bärenreiter, Ferrimontana and ADU-Verlag (later Merseburger Verlag). He wrote chamber music for strings and piano, among others, organ works, Lieder, numerous choral works a cappella and with accompaniment.

=== Piano ===
- 10 Charakterstücke (1989). Möseler, Wolfenbüttel 1994
- Sonata breve (1993). Möseler, Wolfenbüttel 1998
- Setiner Tagebuch (1999); 15 easy pieces for piano 2 and 4 hands. Möseler, Wolfenbüttel 2002

=== Chamber music ===
- Sonatine (1965) for violin and piano. Möseler, Wolfenbüttel 1970
- Violin Interzette (1969). Möseler, Wolfenbüttel 1970
- Duo for flute and violin (1978). Möseler, Wolfenbüttel 1978
- Verstohlen geht der Mond auf (1983). Variations for violin and piano. Möseler, Wolfenbüttel 1986
- Sonata in two movements (1986) for violin and piano. Möseler, Wolfenbüttel 1988
- Trio in three movements (1986) for violin, violoncello and piano.
- Triospiel (1987) for violin, violoncello and piano. Möseler, Wolfenbüttel 1987
- Piano Quartet (1988). Möseler, Wolfenbüttel 1995
- Duo in C-sharp, A and D (1989) for violin and violoncello. Möseler, Wolfenbüttel 1991
- Melusine oder Varie maniere di ascéndere (1990) for violin. Möseler, Wolfenbüttel 1991
- String Trio (1994). Möseler, Wolfenbüttel 2001. Möseler, Wolfenbüttel 2009
- Triosonatine (2001) for alto recorder, flute and piano.
- String Quartet No. 1 (2006). Möseler, Wolfenbüttel 2006
- String Quartet No. 2 (2007). Möseler, Wolfenbüttel 2009

=== Orchestral ===
- Sinfonietta (1946)
- Concerto grosso for string orchestra (1947)
- Symphony No. 1 Die Erscheinung der Reiter (1948)
- The March. Proemio for orchestra (1981)
- Symphony No. 2 (1985). Möseler, Wolfenbüttel 1985
- Silvanus (1989). Möseler, Wolfenbüttel 1996
- Sette Apparizioni (1993)
- Symphony No. 3 (2001)
- Concerto for string orchestra (2001)
- Chamber Symphony for 10 wind instruments (2005)

=== Concertos ===
- Abgesang for violin and orchestra (1995)
- Concerto for bass tuba and orchestra (1996)
- Concertino for marimba and string orchestra (2002)

=== Choral music ===
- Das Hohe Lied Salomons for 6-part mixed choir (1945)
- Der Turmbau zu Babel, Scenic oratorio for 4 solos, male choir and large orchestra (1951)
- Fünf Chorlieder for male choir with piano accompaniment after poems by Joseph von Eichendorff (1959)
- Joseph und seine Brüder, Choral narrative for women's choir and speaking groups (1967). Möseler, Wolfenbüttel 1969
- Invocationen nach Gesängen des Wienhäuser Liederbuches for schola, mixed choir, flute, oboe, violin, cello, double bass and organ (1968). Möseler, Wolfenbüttel 1968
- Parabel vom Dornbusch for mixed choir and orchestra (1969). Möseler, Wolfenbüttel 1969
- Das Stadtwappen. Scene for soloists (tenor, baritone, bass), mixed choir and large orchestra after a text by Franz Kafka (1973)
- Four Italian Madrigals after poems by Giuseppe Ungaretti for solo quartet and mixed choir (1976). Möseler, 1978
- Enchanted Forest for women's choir (1982). Möseler, Wolfenbüttel 1983
- Echo for soloists and mixed choir (1985). Möseler, Wolfenbüttel 1985
- Auf einem Baum ein Kuckuck saß. Volkslied variations for women's choir (1987). Möseler, Wolfenbüttel 1989
- Exemplary Stories for women's choir (1989). Möseler, Wolfenbüttel 1994
- 16 European Christmas carols for mixed choir a cappella ad lib. with wind septet and organ (1991)
- Elia. Choral narrative for mixed choir and organ (1991). Möseler, Wolfenbüttel 2004
- Four Latin choral songs for mixed choir a cappella (1991)
- Jonah. Choral narrative for soli, mixed choir a. organ (1995). Möseler, Wolfenbüttel 1999
- Creator Spirit. Cantata in seven parts for speaker, soloists, mixed choir and 13 winds (1998).
- Zu Weihnachten in Deutschland for speaker, soloists, mixed choir and 14 instruments (2000)
- 6 Christmas songs for women's choir (2003)
- Stephanus. Choral narrative for speaker, soli, mixed choir and organ (revised 2004). Möseler, Wolfenbüttel 2004
- Missa brevis (2005). Möseler, Wolfenbüttel 2005
- Choral songs on words by Goethe, Claudius and Koerppen for mixed choir (2008). Möseler, Wolfenbüttel 2008
- Prayers from the Ark for soloists, women's choir and instruments (revised 2008). Möseler, Wolfenbüttel 2008
- The Most Beautiful. Ode for women's choir (2009). Möseler, Wolfenbüttel 2009
- German Mass for mixed choir (revised 2010). Möseler, Wolfenbüttel 2010
- Verleih uns Frieden gnädiglich. Choral cantata for congregation (1 part choir), mixed choir and instruments (2010). Möseler, Wolfenbüttel 2010
- Der Tod des Johannes. Choral narrative for mixed choir, clarinet a. organ (2010). Möseler, Wolfenbüttel 2011
- Witz und Aberwitz. Nine pieces for mixed choir on words by Erich Kästner, Hugo Ball and Fred Endrikat. Möseler, Wolfenbüttel 2012
- Twelve choral songs for mixed choir. Möseler, Wolfenbüttel 2013
- Kaddish for mixed choir and piano/organ. Möseler, Wolfenbüttel 2014

=== Stage works ===
- Virgilius, der Magier von Rom (text A. Koerppen), grand magic opera for baritone, speaking part, boys' choir and piano or orchestra (Frankfurt, 1951).
- Der verlorene Sohn (The Prodigal Son) (text André Gide), incidental music (1953)
- Der kleine Prinz (The Little Prince) (text Antoine de Saint-Exupéry), incidental music (1963)
- On ne badine pas avec l'amour (text Alfred de Musset), incidental music (1965)
- Arachne, ballet (1968)
- Die Wettermacher (text after Johann Peter Hebel), Singspiel for three boys' voices, male choir, piano, electronic organ and percussion (1972; 1973 Puebla, Mexico)
- Ein Abenteuer auf dem Friedhof (An Adventure in the Cemetery) (text after Guy de Maupassant), chamber opera, prelude and 4 scenes (Hanover, 1980). Möseler, Wolfenbüttel n.d.

== Recordings ==
Several of his works were recorded, such as his string quartets by the Nomos Quartet. A melodrama "Das verschleierte Bild von Sais", setting a poem by Friedrich Schiller on the occasion of his celebration in 2005, was premiered and recorded by duo pianoworte, together with other new melodramas under the title Schiller beflügelt.

== Honours and awards ==
- 1960 Scholarship from the Villa Massimo
- 1983 Lower Saxony State Prize for Culture
- 2007 Cross of Merit on Ribbon (Verdienstkreuz am Bande) of the Lower Saxony Order of Merit
