= Jörg Breiding =

German choral conducting

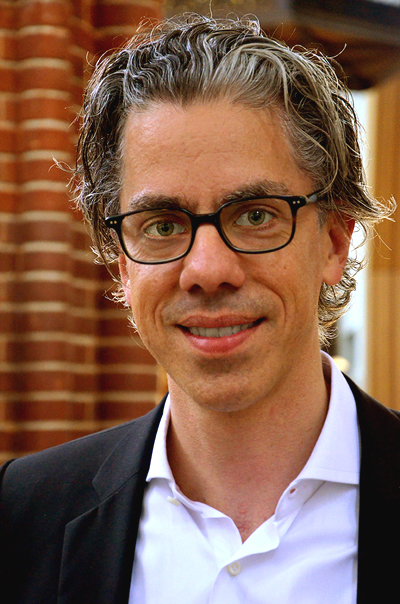
- Breiding in 2015
- Born: 1972 (age 52–53); Hannover, Lower Saxony, West Germany
- Education: Musikhochschule Hannover
- Occupation: Choral conductor
- Organizations: Knabenchor Hannover; Musikhochschule Lübeck; Folkwang Hochschule

Jörg Breiding (born 1972) is a German choral conductor and academic teacher. He has been the conductor of the Knabenchor Hannover since 2002. He taught at the Musikhochschule Lübeck, and has been professor of choral conducting at the Folkwang Hochschule.

== Career ==
Born in Hannover, Breiding studied music pedagogy, voice pedagogy and German at the Musikhochschule Hannover. He also studied conducting choirs and orchestras with Gerd Müller-Lorenz in Lübeck and Heinz Hennig in Hannover. After one year as the assistant of Hennig, who had founded the Knabenchor Hannover in 1950, he succeeded Hennig as artistic director of the boys' choir in January 2002.

Breiding lectured on choral conducting at the Musikhochschule Lübeck from 1998 to 2005. He then became professor of choral conducting at the Folkwang Hochschule, where he founded and conducted the Folkwang Konzertchor and the Folkwang Vokalensemble.

Breiding collaborated in Germany and internationally with ensembles such as Concerto Palatino, London Brass, Barockorchester L’Arco, Hannoversche Hofkapelle, Leipziger Barockorchester, Musica Alta Ripa, Ensemble Resonanz, NDR Radiophilharmonie Hannover, and the Nürnberger Symphoniker, among others.

In 2019, Breiding conducted Knabennchor Hannover singing new arrangements of folk songs written for the choir and the Canadian Brass quintet, in a series of concerts in the Kuppelsaal and at summer festivals such as the Rheingau Musik Festival, in a program for a new CD.

== Recordings ==
Breiding conducted radio productions for NDR, WDR and MDR, and made several recordings, including the world premiere recording of sacred music by Andreas Hammerschmidt, titled Verleih uns Frieden – Geistliche Vokalmusik von Andreas Hammerschmidt with the vocal ensemble Himlische Cantorey and the Johann-Rosenmüller-Ensemble. This recording and a CD of new cantatas for the liturgical year, Glaubenslieder – Neue Kantaten zum Kirchenjahr, were awarded the ECHO Klassik in the category choral recording of the year.

Among recordings with Breiding conducting, there are several of choral works by the label Rondeau Production in Leipzig, including:

- Andreas Hammerschmidt – Verleih uns Frieden, 2005
- John Rutter – Magnificat, Bruder Heinrichs Weihnachten, 2007
- Actus tragicus – Kantaten und Motetten auf dem Weg zu Johann Sebastian Bach, 2008
- Dietrich Buxtehude – Membra Jesu Nostri, 2008
- Glaubenslieder – Neue Kantaten zum Kirchenjahr, 2009
- Michael Praetorius – Michaelisvesper, 2009
- Harald Weiss – Requiem, 2010
- Gloria in excelsis Deo – Advents- und Weihnachtslieder mit dem Knabenchor Hannover mit Sätze von Siegfried Strohbach, 2012
- Knabenchor Hannover – Portrait-CD, 2012
- Folkwang Vokal – Vokalmusik vom frühen Mittelalter bis zur Gegenwart. Folkwang CD Edition, Essen 2012
- Christmas Carols – Festliche Musik zur Weihnachtszeit, 2014
- Johann Sebastian Bach – Markuspassion (BWV 247). Rekonstruktion von Simon Heighes (1995), 2014
- Johann Rosenmüller – Marienvesper, 2015
