= Deutsches Nationaltheater und Staatskapelle Weimar =

Theatre and orchestra in Weimar, Germany

Coordinates: 50°58′46″N 11°19′29″E

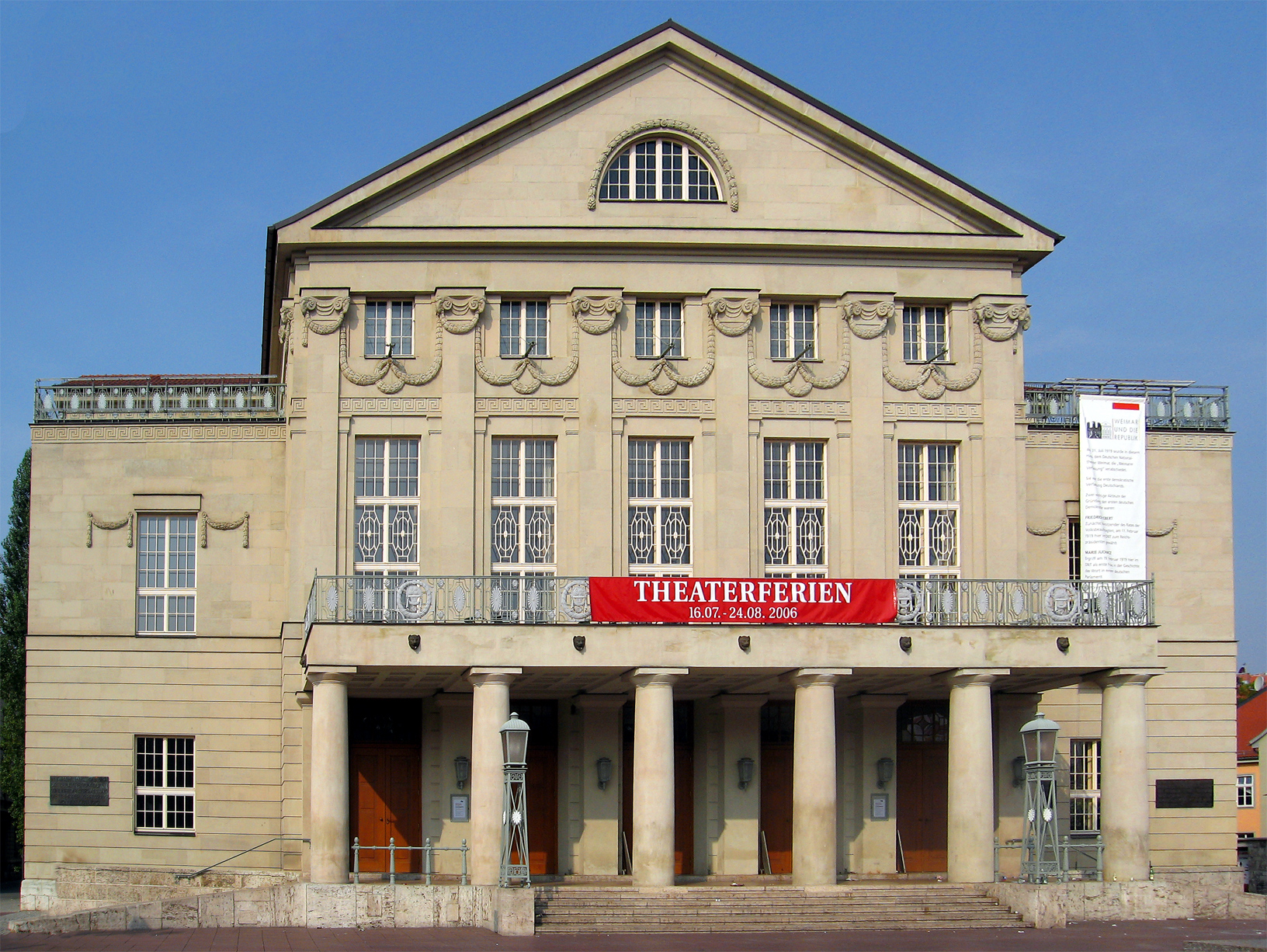
The Main House (Großes Haus) of the Deutsches Nationaltheater

The Deutsches Nationaltheater und Staatskapelle Weimar (DNT), or German National Theater and Weimar State Orchestra, is the most significant arts organization in Weimar. The institution unites the Deutsches Nationaltheater (German National Theater) with the Staatskapelle Weimar (Weimar State Orchestra). It plays on a total of six stages across the city. All sections of the theater and orchestra periodically give additional guest performances and appear in electronic media.

== Venues ==
1. Main House (Großes Haus), traditional main stage on Theaterplatz (music and theatre)
2. Foyer and Studio Stage (Studiobühne), within the main house on Theaterplatz (music and theatre; cabaret)
3. E-Werk Weimar, a former industrial site with two venues, Maschinensaal and Kesselsaal (music and theatre)
4. congresscentrum neue weimarhalle (concerts by the Staatskapelle Weimar)

== The Staatskapelle Weimar ==
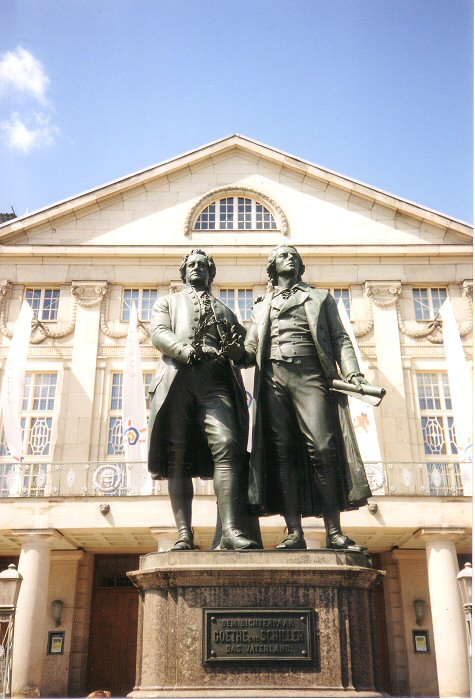
Nationaltheater and Goethe–Schiller Monument (1996)

=== History ===
The precursor ensemble of Staatskapelle Weimar dates from 1482, with the formation of a musical ensemble in service of the Weimar Fürsten (Princes). In 1602, the ensemble attained resident status at the Weimar court, as the Herzoglichen Hofkapelle (Ducal Court Ensemble). Notable musicians in the early history of the Staatskapelle Weimar included Johann Hermann Schein (1615–1616) and Johann Sebastian Bach (1705, 1708–1717), both of whom went on to the St. Thomas Church, Leipzig. Bach particularly worked as resident organist and Kapellmeister.

Johann Nepomuk Hummel served as the ensemble's Kapellmeister from 1819 to 1837, on the appointment by the Grand Duchess Maria Pavlovna. Franz Liszt began his tenure as Kapellmeister in 1842, and championed the music of Richard Wagner, Hector Berlioz, Peter Cornelius. Through this and his teaching activities, Liszt enhanced the prestige of Weimar as a musical hub, notably conducting the world premieres of Wagner's Lohengrin in 1850 and Cornelius's Der Barbier von Bagdad in 1858.

After Liszt left in 1858, he was succeeded by Eduard Lassen who remained as director until his retirement in 1895. Lassen conducted several world premieres during his tenure, including the first performance of Camille Saint-Saëns's Samson et Dalila in 1877. Richard Strauss served as second Kapellmeister under Lassen from 1889 to 1894 and led the premieres of his own Guntram and Engelbert Humperdinck's Hänsel und Gretel.

Peter Raabe became Kapellmeister in 1907. With the end of World War I and the dismantling of the German Empire, the ensemble was renamed the Weimar Staatskapelle.

Artistically, the Court Theatre under the directorship of Carl von Schirach (1909–1918), who relied on a classically oriented programme, made little of a name for itself. Nevertheless, it became a place of worship for the conservative educated middle class. On 9 November 1918, on the occasion of the 100th performance of Mary Stuart and the day of the proclamation of the republic in Germany, a scandal occurred: the performance was interrupted when the audience chanted:

Nieder mit der monarchistischen Theaterei! Jetzt machen wir Theater!

With the November Revolution and the subsequent abdication of Grand Duke Wilhelm Ernst, the Weimar theatre developed into a stage for political self-dramatisation. Schirach was deposed by the provisional state government of the Free State of Saxe-Weimar-Eisenach, the Court Theatre was renamed the State Theatre, and the Court Orchestra was now called the Weimar State Orchestra. On 1 January 1919, the writer Ernst Hardt was appointed as the new artistic director. On 19 January, the day of the elections to the constituent German National Assembly, Hardt announced the renaming of the theatre, which was henceforth to be called the German National Theatre Weimar.

From 6 February to 11 August 1919, the National Assembly met in the theatre to draft what became the Weimar Constitution. The choice of location was intended to claim the "spirit of Weimar" for the young republic. For supporters and opponents of the republic, the theatre became a place of symbolic politics and real conflicts. With the tolerance of the conservative Thuringian state governments, the National Socialists held party meetings here from 1924 onwards, and in 1926 the first Nazi party rally after the ban was lifted was held in the theatre. Ernst Hardt left the theatre in 1924 after there had been fierce and defamatory protests from the völkisch-nationalist side against his performances, which were committed to the ideas of model theatre. Arthur Schnitzler's Round Dance and Oskar Schlemmer's Triadic Ballet enraged the "decent Germans". Until Hardt's departure and the expulsion of the Bauhaus to Dessau, a fruitful collaboration developed between the theatre and the Bauhaus, which was about renewing national culture with combined avant-garde forces.

Hardt's successor, Franz Ulbrich, also initially tried to continue playing contemporary authors such as Ernst Toller, Carl Sternheim and others, despite threats of censorship and demands for "purges" of the Weimar theatre programme. However, he increasingly compromised with the National Socialists, who were involved in the state government from 1930 onwards and demanded a "Jew-free" theatre. In 1933, Ernst Nobbe, a member of the NSDAP party, took over the directorship. Ernst Praetorius directed concert and opera programming from 1924 to 1933. Because his wife was Jewish, Praetorius left the post after the National Socialists ascended to power in Germany in 1933. Paul Sixt directed activities there during the Nazi regime.

In 1936, Hans Severus Ziegler followed, who had already campaigned for a state censorship office in the 1920s. During the Nazi regime, mainly a classical repertoire was played, with Schiller's drama in particular being placed in a National Socialist perspective. The claim to be a national stage of the future fell victim to ideological appropriation by the National Socialists.The theatre played in the casino of the Buchenwald concentration camp for the entertainment of the SS men. While Franz Lehár's The Land of Smiles was applauded in the Main House, the librettist of this successful operetta, Fritz Löhner-Beda, was a prisoner in the Buchenwald concentration camp, only a few kilometres away.

In the fall of 1944, the theater was closed and converted into an armaments factory of the Siemens and Halske company. American explosive and incendiary bombs reduced the theatre to rubble and ashes on 9 February 1945 as part of the air raids on Weimar. Significantly, the Weimar Theatre was the first German theatre to be rebuilt after the war and reopened in August 1948 with Faust I in the production of the new general director Hans-Robert Bortfeldt (1948–1950). Previously, the first post-war ensemble of the National Theatre worked and performed in the Weimarhalle as a provisional venue. On the occasion of Goethe's 200th birthday on 28 August 1949, Thomas Mann, who had been made an honorary citizen of Weimar, gave his famous address to the Germans.

After World War II and the end of the Nazi regime, Hermann Abendroth became Generalmusikdirektor (GMD) and chief conductor of the ensemble, serving from 1945 to 1956. Successive GMD's of the ensemble have included Gerhard Pflüger (1957–1973), Lothar Seyfarth (1973–1979), Rolf Reuter (1979–1980), Peter Gülke (1981–1982), Hans-Peter Frank (1988–1996), George Alexander Albrecht (1996–2002), Jac van Steen (2002–2005) and Carl St.Clair (2005–2008). Oleg Caetani was principal guest conductor of the ensemble from 1984 to 1987. The ensemble was officially renamed the Staatskapelle Weimar in 1988.

In September 2009, the Swedish conductor Stefan Solyom became GMD of the ensemble, with an initial contract of five years. He concluded his Weimar tenure in July 2016. In July 2015, the ensemble announced the appointment of Kirill Karabits as its next GMD and chief conductor, effective with the 2016–2017 season, with an initial contract of three years. Karabits concluded his tenure as its GMD in the summer of 2019, following an inability to reach terms on contract negotiations for extending his tenure.

In June 2020, the company announced the appointment of Dominik Beykirch as its new chief conductor, effective with the 2020–2021 season. Beykirch had previously served as Zweite Kapellmeister and Erste Koordinierter Kapellmeister with the company. The company elevated Beykrich's title to music director as of the 2023–2024 season. In October 2023, the company announced the appointment of Ivan Repušić as the next chief conductor of the Staatskapelle Weimar, effective with the 2024–2025 season. In August 2024, the company announced that Beykirch is to stand down as music director of the company, per his own request, at the close of the 2024–2025 season. In March 2025, the company announced the appointment of Daniel Carter as its next music director, effective with the 2025–2026 season.

=== General music directors ===
- Hermann Abendroth (1945–1956)
- Gerhard Pflüger (1957–1973)
- Lothar Seyfarth (1973–1979)
- Rolf Reuter (1979–1980)
- Peter Gülke (1981–1982)
- Hans-Peter Frank (1988–1996)
- George Alexander Albrecht (1996–2002)
- Jac van Steen (2002–2005)
- Carl St.Clair (2005–2008)
- Stefan Solyom (2009–2016)
- Kirill Karabits (2016–2019)
- Dominik Beykirch (2023–2025)
- Daniel Carter (2025–present)
