= Karen Kamensek =

American orchestral and opera conductor (born 1970)

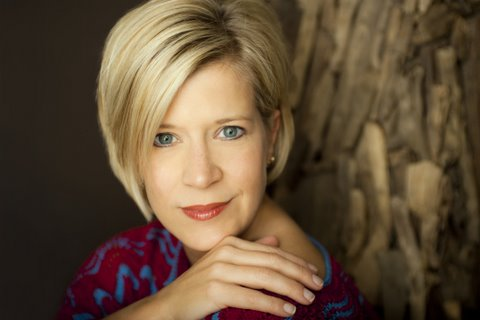
- Born: January 2, 1970 (age 56); Chicago, Illinois, U.S.
- Education: Indiana University
- Website: www.karenkamensek.com

Karen Kamensek (born January 2, 1970, in Chicago) is an American orchestral and opera conductor.

== Biography ==
Kamensek's parents immigrated from Kamnica pri Mariboru, Slovenia to the United States, settling in Chicago, where she was born in 1970. She began playing the piano at the age of four while living in Chicago and a year later she moved with her parents to New Albany, Indiana, in the metropolitan area of Louisville, Kentucky. She grew up in New Albany and is an alumna of New Albany High School.

Having undergone musical education from an early age, she won the Louisville Orchestra Young Artists Competition, before attending Indiana University for undergraduate and graduate studies. Kamensek received degrees in orchestral conducting and piano performance from Indiana University's Jacobs School of Music.

Kamensek moved to Austria where she served as the first Kapellmeister of the Volksoper Wien from 2000 to 2002. She then moved to Germany and was general music director (Generalmusikdirektorin, or GMD) of the Theater Freiburg from 2003 to 2006, the first female conductor in Freiburg history. She served as interim music director at the Slovenian National Theatre in Maribor from 2007 to 2008, and Associate Music Director at the Staatsoper Hamburg in Germany from 2008 to 2011. In 2011, the Staatsoper Hannover named Kamensek as its GMD and principal conductor, the first female conductor to hold the Hannover posts. She relinquished the GMD title in 2015 and remained as principal conductor through 2016.

Kamensek first guest-conducted the Calgary Philharmonic Orchestra in 2022. In September 2025, the orchestra announced the appointment of Kamensek to the newly-created post of principal guest conductor.

=== Work with Philip Glass ===
Kamensek is a noted advocate and interpreter of the music of Philip Glass. She made her English National Opera (ENO) conducting debut in March 2016 with Glass's opera Akhnaten. Kamensek has frequently collaborated with Glass and conducted the 2005 Orange Mountain Music recording of the composer's Les Enfants Terribles. In 2017, Kamensek gave her debut concert at The Proms, with Britten Sinfonia, conducting the first full live performance of Philip Glass's and Ravi Shankar's Passages, with Shankar's daughter Anoushka Shankar as soloist. She returned to ENO for their 2018 revival of Glass's Satyagraha.

In November 2019, Kamensek made her Metropolitan Opera conducting debut with Akhnaten. On 23 November 2019, Kamensek conducted the Metropolitan Opera Live in HD performance and cinema transmission of Akhnaten, the second female conductor ever to be featured in the Metropolitan Opera Live in HD series. The recording of Akhnaten subsequently won a 2022 Grammy Award for Best Opera Recording. In July 2026, Kamensek conducted the world premiere performance of Glass's Symphony No. 15 ('Lincoln') at the Tanglewood Music Center, following his decision to cancel the previously scheduled world premiere at the Kennedy Center.

Cultural offices
Preceded by Kwamé Ryan	General Music Director, Theater Freiburg; 2003–2006	Succeeded by Patrik Ringborg
Preceded by Wolfgang Bozic	General Music Director, Staatsoper Hannover; 2011–2016	Succeeded by Ivan Repušić
