= Fairy-tale opera =

Fairy-tale opera may refer to any of several traditions of opera based on fairy tales.

- Opéra féerie is a French genre of opera or opéra-ballet, often with elements of magic in their stories.
- The English genre of "fairy opera" includes Gilbert and Sullivan's Iolanthe
- The German genre of Märchenoper (fairy-tale opera) has its roots in Italian opera. Hänsel und Gretel is considered a key work of the genre.
