= Mädchenchor Hannover =

German girl's choir

- Choir
- Origin: Hannover, Lower Saxony, Germany
- Founded: 1951
- Founder: Heinz Hennig
- Genre: Concert girls' choir
- Chief conductor: Andreas Felber
- Website: www.maedchenchor-hannover.de

Der Mädchenchor Hannover is a girls' choir of girls and young women, based in Hannover, the state capital of Lower Saxony, Germany. Girls and young woman between ages 14 and 20 perform a wide range of repertoire from Renaissance to contemporary music. The choir won prizes at international competitions and made recordings.

== History ==
Heinz Hennig, the conductor of the Knabenchor Hannover from its founding in 1950 to 2001, founded the girls choir in 1951, and initially led the group. From 1952 to 1977, Ludwig Rutt directed the choir. From 1978 until his death in 1999, Rutt shared the leadership with Gudrun Schröfel, who then took over. Similarly, from 2017 she shared leadership with her designated successor, Andreas Felber who took over in 2019.

The choir recorded for German and international broadcasters, and for CDs. Several former members became musicians, some of them professional singers. The choir has achieved prizes at international competitions beginning in 1964.

== Awards ==
- 1964: International competition Neerpelt / Belgium – first prize
- 1981: International competition Guido d' Arezzo / Italiy – first prize
- 1982: 1st Deutscher Chorwettbewerb in Cologne – first prize
- 1983: Let the Peoples Sing – BBC in London – first prize
- 1986: City Medal Hannover for merits for the city
- 1987: International competition Varna / Bulgaria – first prize
- 1987: Niedersachsenpreis für Kultur
- 1989: Internationaler Kammerchorwettbewerb Marktoberdorf – third prize
- 1990: 3rd Deutscher Chorwettbewerb in Stuttgart – first prize
- 1995: International Smetana Chorwettbewerb Litomyšl / Czech Republic – first prize and winner
- 1997: Johannes-Brahms-Wettbewerb Hamburg – first prize
- 2003: Internationaler Kammerchorwettbewerb Marktoberdorf – second prize
- 2005: Let the Peoples Sing – WDR in Cologne – second prize
- 2006: 7th Deutscher Chorwettbewerb in Kiel – first prize
- 2010: ECHO Klassik
- 2014: 9th Deutscher Chorwettbewerb Weimar – first prize

== Recordings ==
- Johann Adolph Hasse / Antonio Vivaldi: Miserere, Salve Regina und Gloria - 2023
- Reger / Humperdinck / Cornelius et al.: Weihnachtliche Chormusik der Romantik – 2019
- Andreas N. Tarkmann: Inka-Kantate "Töchter der Sonne" / Gustav Holst: Savitri (chamber opera) – 2018
- Fauré / Messager: Messe des pêcheur de Villerville and Bach / Pergolesi: Tilge, Höchster, meine Sünden – 2016
- Britten: Children's Crusade / A Ceremony of Carols – 2015
- Johann Michael Haydn / Hans Kössler: Messen für Frauenchor – 2013
- Tarkmann: Didos Geheimnis – 2013
- André Caplet: Le Miroir de Jésus – 2012
- Geliebte Seele – Romantische Lieder und Duette – 2010
- Orff: Carmina Burana – with Knabenchor Hannover, NDR Radiophilharmonie, 2008
- Gaude, Plaude! – Psalmen und Motetten aus italienischen Konventen – with Hannoversche Hofkapelle, 2008
- Gloria! – Weihnachtliche Klänge mit dem Mädchenchor Hannover – with Stockholm Chamber Brass, 2007
- Von Mozart bis Messiaen – with NDR Radiophilharmonie, 2006
- Brahms: Gesänge für Frauenchor, Hörner und Harfe, with NDR Radiophilharmonie, 2003
- Wenn sich die Welt auftut – Europäische Chormusik des 19. und 20. Jahrhunderts – 2000
- Concert for a new Millenium – Mädchenchor Hannover auf der EXPO 2000 – 2000
- Kaleidoskop 2 – 1999
- Brahms: Es tönt ein voller Harfenklang – Weltliche und geistliche Gesänge für Frauenchor, 1996
- Folk songs of the four seasons / Was die Alten sungen – 1996
- Johann Adolf Hasse: Miserere in C minor / Johann Michael Haydn: Missa Sti. Aloysii – with Kammerakademie Hannover, 1995
- Jakobs Stern ist aufgegangen – Weihnachtliche Chormusik – 1992
- Britten: A Ceremony of Carols / Heinrich von Herzogenberg: 6 Mädchenlieder / Petr Eben: Griechisches Wörterbuch – 1990
- Chorwerke der Romantik – 1986
- Kaleidoskop – collection 1982–1993

== Film ==
- Die Stimme der Mädchen, NDR television 2017, author: Tobias Hartmann, first aired 3 December 2017
