= Günther Wich =

German conductor (born 1928)

- Born: 23 May 1928 (age 98); Bamberg, Germany
- Occupations: Conductor; Academic teacher
- Organizations: Staatsoper Hannover; Musikhochschule Würzburg; Deutsche Oper am Rhein
- Title: Generalmusikdirektor

Günther Wich (or Günter, born 23 May 1928) is a German conductor who was Generalmusikdirektor (GMD) of the Staatsoper Hannover, and for 17 years of the Deutsche Oper am Rhein. He was professor of conducting at the Musikhochschule Würzburg.

== Life and career ==
Wich was born in Bamberg, Germany. His first instrument was the recorder, but he soon changed to the flute, taking lessons from a flutist of the Theater Saarbrücken. After his Abitur in 1949, he studied flute with Gustav Scheck and conducting with Konrad Lechner and Carl Ueter at the Musikhochschule Freiburg. From 1952, he worked as an assistant to GMD Heinz Dressel at the Theater Freiburg who delegated him to the operetta, finding his piano playing not sufficient for opera. He worked for Siegfried Köhler, who influenced him greatly. The first work he conducted in performance was Zeller's Der Vogelhändler. He was promoted to first Kapellmeister, conducting such operas as Wagner's Lohengrin and Die Meistersinger von Nürnberg, and Der Rosenkavalier and Salome by Richard Strauss.

In 1959 Wich moved to the Graz Opera where he was offered the position of Musikalischer Oberleiter (music supervisor), created for him. He became GMD of the Staatsoper Hannover from 1961 to 1965. He then moved on to the Deutsche Oper am Rhein where he remained for 17 years.

Wich was professor of conducting at the Musikhochschule Würzburg from 1962.

== Recordings ==
Wich recorded Henze's Drei Dithyramben with the Rundfunk-Kammerorchester Saarbrücken.
