= Silvius von Kessel =

German church organist (born 1965)

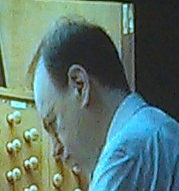

Silvius Carlos Benedict von Kessel (born 20 February 1965) is a German organist, improviser, composer and choirmaster.

== Career ==
Von Kessel was born in Oldenburg. He is Cathedral Organist and Choirmaster of Erfurt Cathedral, the capital of the Free State of Thuringia in Germany, as well as honorary professor of organ music at the Hochschule für Musik "Franz Liszt", Weimar.

He is President of the festival Thüringer Bachwochen. relating to the music of Johann Sebastian Bach who was born 1685 in Eisenach, Thuringia. The Thüringer Bachwochen festival is the biggest festival of classical music in Thuringia. Silvius von Kessel founded the "International BACH/LISZT Organ Competition Erfurt-Weimar".

He studied organ music and church music at the Folkwang Hochschule Essen with Professor Gisbert Schneider from 1986 to 1991 passing his A Exam with distinction. He continued his organ study from 1991 to 1994 in Paris with Professor Olivier Latry getting the "Diplôme de Concertiste" in 1994. In the same year he was appointed Cathedral Organist and Choirmaster of Erfurt Cathedral.

He has lately composed a big symphonic mass (Missa Cum Jubilo, taking about 70 minutes) for Soloists, Mixed Choir, Children´s Choir, Organ and Symphonic Orchestra. The première has taken place in september 2019 in Erfurt Cathedral and has created an enormous positive echo.

== Family ==
Silvius von Kessel is married to Christine Countess of Königsmarck and they have five children. He is a cousin of the actress Sophie von Kessel.

== Writings/Musicology ==
- Silvius von Kessel: Original oder Adaptation? Eine Untersuchung an fünf Paaren Gregorianischer Gesänge gleicher Melodie bei verschiedenem Text (in: Beiträge zur Gregorianik, Heft 18, ConBrio Verlagsgesellschaft Regensburg 1994)

== Audio recordings ==
- Die Orgeln und Glocken des Erfurter Domberges (1997)
- Wachet auf - Symphonische Orgelmusik im Erfurter Dom (2001)
- Orgelland Thüringen - Vol. 5: Die Orgel in der Wallfahrtskirche St. Antonius zu Worbis (2013), recording made together with Prof. Michael Kapsner (Weimar)
