= Heinz Hennig =

German choral conductor and academic teacher

- Heinz Hennig, in c. 1980
- Born: 25 May 1927; Burg bei Magdeburg, Germany
- Died: 29 January 2002 (aged 74); Hannover, Germany
- Occupations: Choral conductor; Academic teacher
- Organizations: Knabenchor Hannover; Musikhochschule Hannover
- Awards: Deutscher Schallplattenpreis

Heinz Hennig (25 May 1927 – 29 January 2002) was a German choral conductor and an academic teacher, known for founding the Knabenchor Hannover in 1950 and leading it until 2001.

== Career ==
Born in Burg bei Magdeburg, Heinz Hennig was educated at the boarding school Musisches Gymnasium Frankfurt, namely by Kurt Thomas. He studied in Hannover.

In 1950 he founded the Knabenchor Hannover. In 1961 he cofounded the youth orchestra "Junges Sinfonieorchester Hannover" (JSO). He prepared the boys choir for the recording of Bach cantatas in a collaboration with Gustav Leonhardt, published as "Das Kantatenwerk" by Teldec. Hennig belonged to the first conductors pursuing historically informed performance. He revived neglected works of Heinrich Schütz and Andreas Hammerschmidt, among others. He conducted the choir in five Schütz recordings between 1982 and 1999, four of them won prizes such as the Deutscher Schallplattenpreis. He also premiered works of composers such as Alfred Koerppen, who wrote in 1951 a youth opera Virgilius, der Magier von Rom that the choir performed successfully at the "Sängerfest" in Frankfurt.

Heinz Hennig was a teacher for choral conducting at the Hochschule für Musik und Theater Hannover between 1962 and 1992, serving as the institute's vice president from 1970. He also conducted its chamber choir.

As the director of the Knabenchor Hannover, he led it in collaborations with Ton Koopman, Philippe Herreweghe and the Hilliard Ensemble. To celebrate the choir's 50th anniversary in 2000, Hennig conducted Bach's St Matthew Passion in a collaboration with the Thomanerchor, prepared by Georg Christoph Biller. He led the choir until 2001.

He died in Hannover on 29 January 2002.
