= Knabenchor Hannover =

- Choir
- Origin: Hannover
- Founded: 1950
- Founder: Heinz Hennig
- Genre: Concert boys' choir
- Chief conductor: Jörg Breiding
- Website: knabenchor-hannover.eu

The Knabenchor Hannover (Hannover Boys' Choir) is a boys choir founded in 1950 by Heinz Hennig, who served as conductor until the end of 2001. Since 2002, the conductor has been Jörg Breiding.

== History and music ==
The Knabenchor Hannover has traditionally performed music by 17th-century composers, namely Heinrich Schütz. The choir's five Schütz recordings, conducted by Hennig between 1982 and 1999, set standards for performances of this repertoire; four of them won prizes such as the Deutscher Schallplattenpreis. The choir turned to works of Andreas Hammerschmidt in 1998, recording his sacred choral music.

The Knabenchor Hannover was among the first choirs to take an interest in historically informed performance and achieved international acclaim. Conductors such as Gustav Leonhardt, Ton Koopman, Alan Gilbert, Ingo Metzmacher and Christoph Eschenbach regularly work with the choir, as do ensembles such as the Amsterdam Baroque Orchestra, the Akademie für Alte Musik Berlin, London Brass and many German symphony orchestras.

Besides performing at festivals both in Germany and abroad (including Europe, China, Israel, Japan, Russia, South and Central America, the US and South Africa), the Knabenchor Hannover records regularly and can frequently be heard on radio.

In 2000 the choir celebrated 50 years with a recorded performance in Hannover of Bach's St Matthew Passion together with the Thomanerchor.

In 2006, the Knabenchor Hannover was awarded the Echo Klassik in the category "Choral works - recording of the year" for the CD "Verleih uns Frieden", including the world's first recording of several works by Andreas Hammerschmidt that were believed lost for more than 350 years.

In 2009 Harald Weiss dedicated his requiem composition Schwarz vor Augen und es ward Licht to the Knabenchor Hannover, premiered on 31 October 2009 with the NDR Symphony Orchestra and soloists Dorothee Mields and Andreas Karasiak.

In 2010 the choir celebrated 60 years with Monteverdi's Vespro della Beata Vergine 1610, 400 years after the work's first publication.

In 2018 the choir first sang at the Elbphilharmonie in Hamburg.
