= Gudrun Schröfel =

German conductor and professor

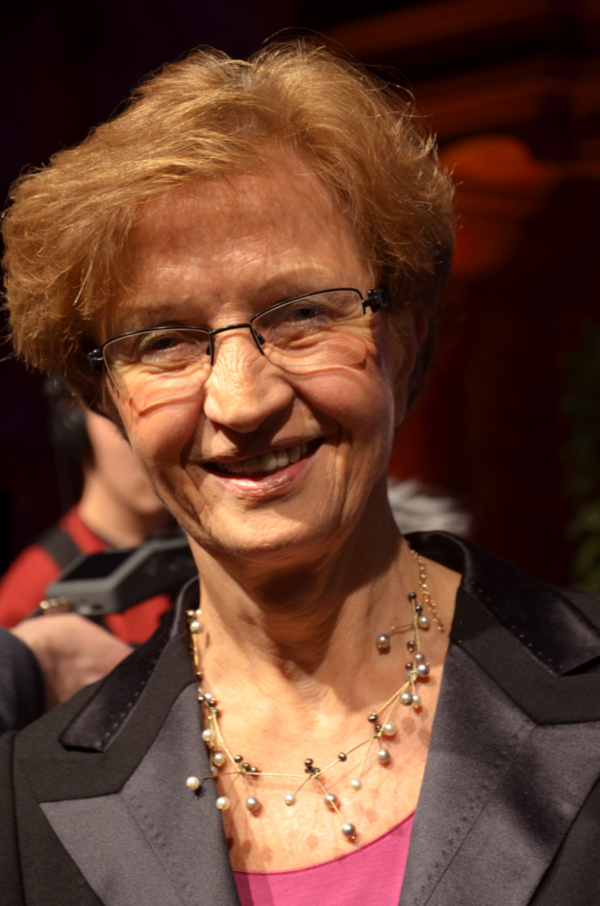
- Gudrun Schröfel in 2015, receiving Niedersächsischer Staatspreis
- Born: 1 February 1943 (age 83)
- Education: Musikhochschule Hannover
- Occupations: Choral conductor; Academic teacher
- Organizations: Folkwang Hochschule; Musikhochschule Hannover; Mädchenchor Hannover; Johannes-Brahms-Chor Hannover
- Awards: Lower Saxony Order of Merit; Niedersächsischer Staatspreis

Gudrun Schröfel (born 1 February 1943) is a German choral conductor, conductor and academic teacher. She led choirs, namely the Mädchenchor Hannover, to competition successes and awards for recordings.

== Life ==
Schröfel studied music pedagogy, conducting, voice and voice pedagogy at the Musikhochschule Hannover. She studied further with Eric Ericson and Arleen Augér. She first focused on concert singing in oratorios and lieder, and conducted choir and orchestra at a Musikgymnasium.

She was appointed professor of music pedagogy, with a focus on conducting choirs and ensembles, at the Folkwang Hochschule in Essen in 1985. She moved to the Hochschule für Musik, Theater und Medien Hannover where she also served as vice president for thirteen years, until her retirement in 2012.

She was conductor and artistic director of the Mädchenchor Hannover from 1999, succeeding Ludwig Rutt. From 2017, she shared the position with Andreas Felber in a time of transition until 1 January 2019. She has been leader of the Johannes-Brahms-Chor Hannover, a mixed chamber choir, from 2001. She initiated the composition of music for choirs of limited voice range (gleichstimmige Chöre).

With the Mädchenchor Hannover, Schröfel received prizes and awards at national and international competitions, such as Deutscher Chorwettbewerb, the EBU competition Let the Peoples Sing, the Internationaler Kammerchorwettbewerb Marktoberdorf and the Johannes-Brahms-Wettbewerb in Hamburg. The Johannes Brahms Chor won the Deutscher Chorwettbewerb with her conducting. In 2010, both choirs received the ECHO Klassik together with six other choirs from Hannover.

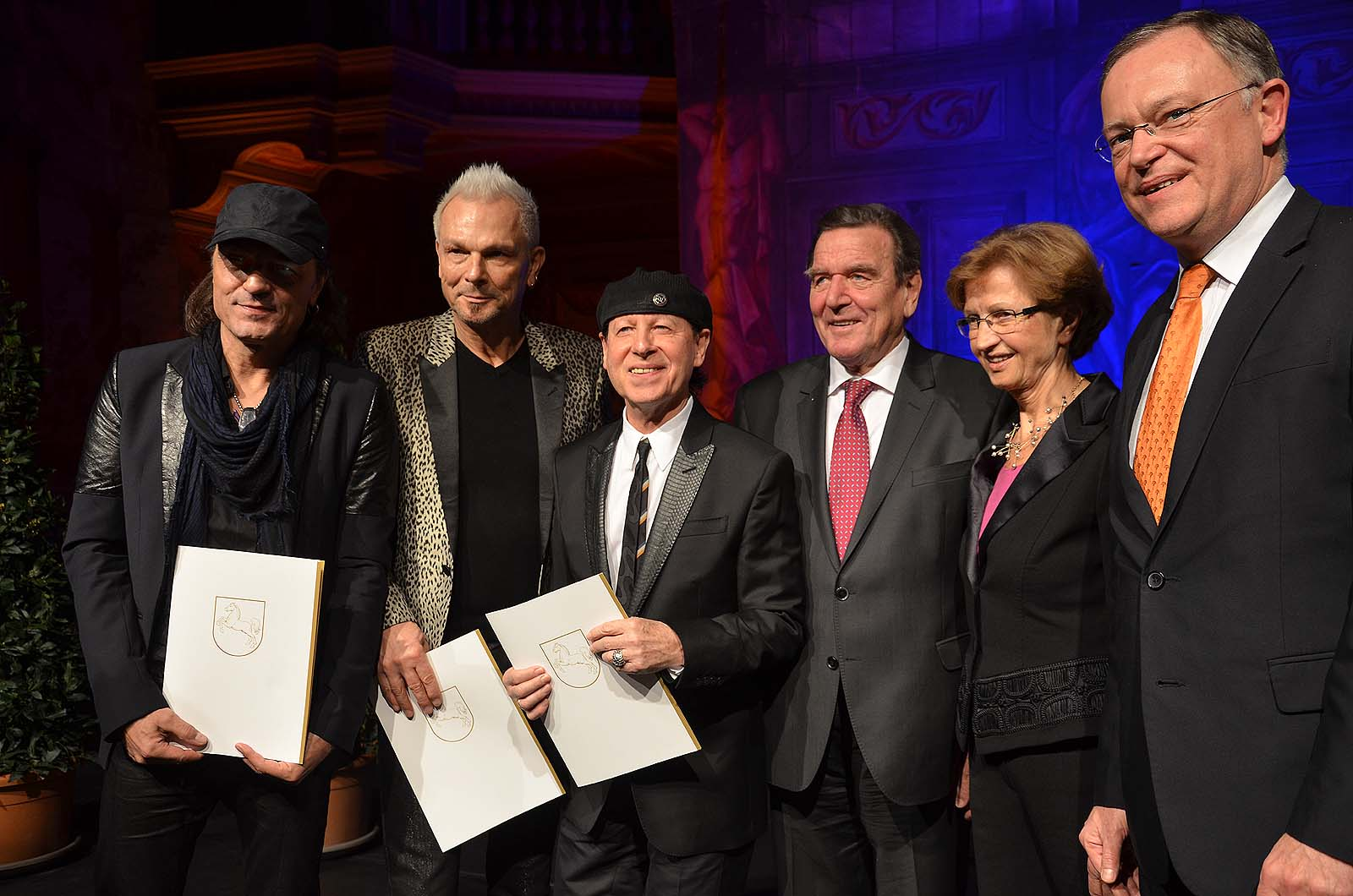
2014 Niedersächsischer Staatspreis, with Gerhard Schröder, third from right

She was awarded the Niedersächsischer Musikpreis in 1989, and received the Lower Saxony Order of Merit in 2004. She has made more than 20 recordings. She was awarded the 2014 Niedersächsischer Staatspreis (Lower Saxony State Prize) in February 2015, and the Niedersächsische Landesmedaille in 2018.
