= Volker David Kirchner =

German musician (1942–2020)

- Volker David Kirchner, in the 2010s
- Born: 25 June 1942; Mainz, Germany
- Died: 4 February 2020 (aged 77); Wiesbaden, Germany
- Education: Peter Cornelius Conservatory; Hochschule für Musik Köln; Hochschule für Musik Detmold
- Occupations: Violist; Chamber musician; Composer
- Organizations: Kehr Trio; Radio-Sinfonie-Orchester Frankfurt; Hessisches Staatstheater Wiesbaden
- Awards: Rheingau Musikpreis; Peter Cornelius Plaque; Kunstpreis Rheinland-Pfalz
- Website: www.volkerdavidkirchner.de

Volker David Kirchner (25 June 1942 – 4 February 2020) was a German composer and violist. After studies of violin and composition at the Peter Cornelius Conservatory, the Hochschule für Musik Köln and the Hochschule für Musik Detmold, he worked for decades as a violist in the Radio-Sinfonie-Orchester Frankfurt. He was simultaneously the violist in the Kehr Trio founded by his violin teacher Günter Kehr, and a composer of incidental music at the Hessisches Staatstheater Wiesbaden.

He was known for his operas which were commissioned by major German opera houses. Die Trauung was premiered at Hessisches Staatstheater Wiesbaden in 1975, Die fünf Minuten des Isaak Babel, described as a scenic Requiem, premiered at the Opernhaus Wuppertal in 1980, and Gilgamesh was commissioned for the Expo 2000 and staged at the Staatsoper Hannover. His operas often focus on historic personalities such as Savonarola and Gutenberg. Kirchner also composed two symphonies, concertos, keyboard music, sacred music such as the Missa Moguntina for the Mainz Cathedral, and especially chamber music. His music has been recorded, and performed internationally.

== Life ==
Born in Mainz, Kirchner took his first violin lessons with his grandfather. He studied at the Peter Cornelius Conservatory in Mainz from 1956 to 1959, violin with Günter Kehr and musical composition with Günter Raphael. On a recommendation by Kehr, he then studied at the Hochschule für Musik Köln from 1959 to 1963, where he was influenced by composers Bernd Alois Zimmermann, Karlheinz Stockhausen and Pierre Boulez. Kirchner studied further with Tibor Varga at the Hochschule für Musik Detmold from 1964 to 1965. He played in jazz ensembles in Cologne.

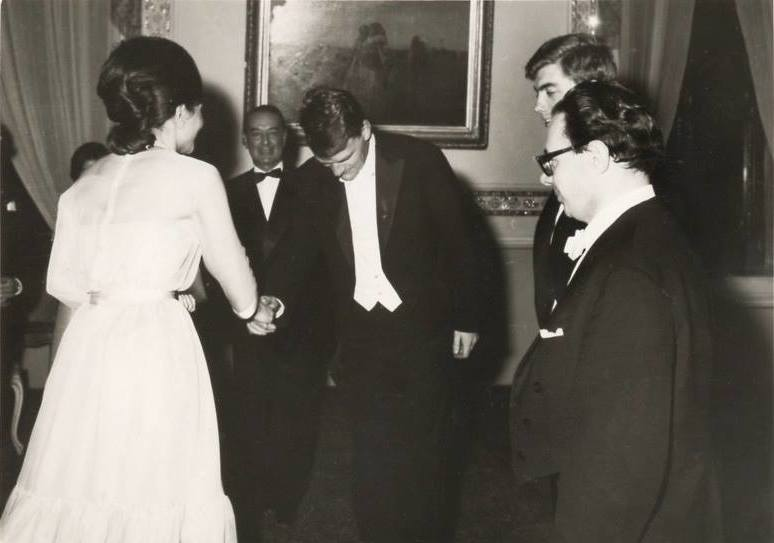
After a concert of the Kehr Trio at the Marble Palace in Tehran on 13 April 1965, Farah Diba greets (from left) Braunholz, Kirchner and Kehr.

Kirchner was principal violist in the chamber orchestra Rheinisches Kammerorchester Köln from 1962 to 1964. He was a violist of the Radio-Sinfonie-Orchester Frankfurt (RSO) from 1966 to 1988. As a chamber musician, he played viola in the Kehr Trio, with his teacher as the violinist and cellist Bernhard Braunholz, recording and touring in South America, North Africa and the Near East. In 1970, he co-founded the Ensemble 70 in Wiesbaden. From 1972 to 1974, he was also a composer of incidental music (Bühnenmusik) for the Hessisches Staatstheater Wiesbaden. It prepared him for writing his operas, with a focus on the relation of text and music.

He became known when his first opera was premiered in 1975, Die Trauung (The Wedding), after Witold Gombrowicz's The Marriage. It was played on 27 April 1975 at the Staatstheater Wiesbaden, conducted by Siegfried Köhler. Kirchner was then commissioned to write more stage works. During the 1980s, Generalmusikdirektor Siegfried Köhler promoted his operas in Wiesbaden, conducting in 1981 Das kalte Herz (The cold heart) after a fairy-tale by Wilhelm Hauff, revised in 1987 for a performance on 27 October 1988 at the Staatstheater am Gärtnerplatz in Munich. Kirchner's Die fünf Minuten des Isaak Babel (The five minutes of Isaac Babel), subtitled A Scenic Requiem, premiered on 19 April 1980 at the Opernhaus Wuppertal, conducted by Hanns-Martin Schneidt and staged by Friedrich Meyer-Oertel. Belshazar premiered in 1985 at the Bavarian State Opera, and Gilgamesch premiered for the Expo 2000 in Hanover. The production at the Staatsoper Hannover was staged by Hans-Peter Lehmann in a set design by Ekkehard Grübler, and conducted by Stefan Sanderling. His Violin Concerto was first performed in the Berliner Philharmonie in 1984, and his Requiem Messa di pace received its first performance in Moscow 1990 for the opening of a festival. Musicians such as violinists Ulf Hoelscher and Christian Tetzlaff, violist Tabea Zimmermann, cellists Yo Yo Ma, Wolfgang Boettcher and Martin Ostertag, and pianists Lars Vogt and Nina Tichman played his music, in collaboration with conductors such as Gerd Albrecht, Leif Segerstam and Eliahu Inbal.

Kirchner moved to Mainz and became a freelance composer in 1988. Invited by Walter Fink, he was the third composer featured in the annual Komponistenporträt of the Rheingau Musik Festival (RMF) in 1992. In 1997, the Kleines Haus of the Staatstheater Mainz opened with his Labyrinthos. In 2010, he was one of five living composers, with Toshio Hosokawa, Helmut Lachenmann, Wolfgang Rihm and Jörg Widmann, whose music celebrated the 80th birthday of Walter Fink in a concert of the Rheingau Musik Festival. His piano piece was titled Nachlese (Gleaning).

Kirchner died in Wiesbaden on 4 February 2020 at the age of 77.

== Work ==
Kirchner's compositions have included solo pieces, string quartets and other chamber music, symphonies and solo concertos, culminating in works for the stage. His operas often have a political background. Isaak Babel, a 1980 work, shows a person facing the Russian Revolution. Savonarola, a 2011 opera, deals with the short reign of a religious fanatic. Gutenberg, written in 2012, shows the genius from Mainz who had difficulties introducing his invention. Kirchner composed the mass Missa Moguntina in 1993 especially for the Mainz Cathedral, reflecting his roots. The text is the Latin mass expanded by Psalm 130, "De profundis", and Kirchner studied the acoustics of the cathedral.

Kirchner's works were published by Schott, including:

Opera

- Riten, described as "für kleines Klangtheater" (for a small sound-theatre), premiered in 1971 in Graz, Steirischer Herbst, and afterwards at the Hessisches Staatstheater Wiesbaden
- Die Trauung (The Wedding, 1974) after Witold Gombrowicz, premiered 27 April 1975, Hessisches Staatstheater Wiesbaden
- Die fünf Minuten des Isaak Babel, Szenisches Requiem in zwölf Bildern (1977–79), premiered 19 April 1980 at the Opernhaus Wuppertal
- Das kalte Herz / Ein deutsches Märchen after Wilhelm Hauff (1980), premiered 1981 in Wiesbaden, revised in 1987 for a performance on 27 October 1988 at the Staatstheater am Gärtnerplatz
- Belshazar (1986); commissioned by the Bayerische Staatsoper, premiered on 25 January 1985
- Erinys, Threnos in two parts after the Oresteia by Aeschylos (1986–89), premiered on 15 April 1990 in Wuppertal
- Inferno d'amore (Shakespearion I) after Shakespeare and Michelangelo (1992), staged premiere on 12 March 1995, Ballhof by Niedersächsisches Staatstheater
- Labyrinthos (Shakespearion II) (1994/95), premiered 17 October 1997 in Mainz for the opening of the Kleines Haus of the Staatstheater Mainz
- Gilgamesh (2002), commissioned by the Niedersächsische Staatsoper on the occasion of the EXPO 2000, premiered on 20 May 2000
- Ahasver, scenic oratorio (1998–2000), commissioned by the Theater Bielefeld, premiered in 2001
- Savonarola, premiered in 2011 at the Opernhaus Kiel
- Gutenberg (2011–12), premiered in Erfurt on 24 March 2016

Sacred music

- Requiem – Messa di Pace for soloist, choir and orchestra (1988)
- Missa Moguntina for soloist, choir, two echo-choirs, orchestra and organ (1993)
- Aus den 53 Tagen, Passion music for soloists, mixed chorus, male chorus, boys chorus, speaker (Evangelist) and orchestra (1998); commissioned by the "93. Deutscher Katholikentag" in Mainz

Orchestra

- Choral Variations for 15 solo strings (1967–1968)
- Bildnisse I for orchestra (1981–1982)
- Bildnisse II for orchestra (1983–1984)
- Bildnisse III: Hommage à W. A. Mozart for small orchestra (1989–1991)
- Symphony No. 2 "Mythen" (1992), premiered in Wiesbaden as part of the Rheingau Musik Festival

Concertante

- Nachtstück: Varianten über eine Wagnersche Akkordverbindung (Nocturne: Variations on a Wagnerian Chord Progression) for viola and chamber orchestra (1980–1981, revised 1983)
- Schibboleth, Poème Concertante for viola and orchestra (1989)
- Violin Concerto (Homage à Krzysztof Penderecki) (1981–1982)
- Oboe Concerto (1997–1998)

Chamber music

- Dybuk for marimba solo (1995)
- Aus dem Buch der Könige, 3 Meditations for cello solo (2000)
- Piano Trio (1979)
- String Quartet [No.1] (1982–1983)
- Mysterion for altoflute, horn, viola d'amore, cello and piano (1985)
- Tre Poemi for horn and piano (1987)
- Drei Lieder (2 Songs) for medium voice, horn, violin, cello and piano (1985–1986)
- Und Salomo sprach ... (And Solomon spoke) for cello solo (1987)
- Tre poemi (3 Poems) for horn and piano (1986–1987)
- Der blaue Harlekin (Hommage à Picasso) for flute, clarinet, 2 bassoons (also contrabassoon), 2 trumpets and 2 trombones (1981)
- Saitenspiel for violin and cello (1993)
- Gethsemani, Notturno for string sextet (1994)
- Quartet for clarinet, violin, cello and piano (1984)
- Il canto della notte, Poema for clarinet, horn, piano, violin, viola and cello (1997–1998)
- Orphischer Gesang II for string sextet (1998)
- String Trio (2000)
- String Quartet No. 2 (1999)
- String Quartet No. 3 (2000)
- String Quartet No. 4 with obligato clarinet (2000)
- String Quartet No. 5 (2000, revised 2002)
- String Quartet No. 6 (2000)
- "Meine Augen möchte ich erfreuen, Shulamith..." for flute, horn, viola, cello and piano (2001)
- Pierrots Galgenlieder for clarinet solo (2001)
- Kreuzweg for 2 oboes and English horn (2001)
- Pietà, Partita for violin solo (2001)
- String Quartet No. 7 (2003) Odysee (Odyssey)
- String Quartet No. 8 (2004) Wanlung (Change)
- String Quartet No. 9 (2005)
- Piano Quartet No. 1 (2005) Echo und Narziss (Echo and Narcissus)
- Threnos for solo cello (2006); written for the Feuermann Competition
- String Quartet No. 10 (2006–2007) Abgesangsszene (Singing Scene)
- Strophen for 2 clarinets (also bass clarinet) and piano (2007)
- String Quartet No. 11 (2007–2008)
- String Quartet No. 12 (2005–2008) Inschrift (Inscription)
- String Quartet No. 13 (2007)
- String Quartet No. 14 (2009–2010)
- String Quartet No. 15 (2010)
- String Quartet No. 16 (2010)
- Piano Quartet No. 2 (2010) Psyche und Eros (Cupid and Psyche)
- Piano Quartet No. 3 (2012) Der große Tango (The Great Tango)
- Piano Quartet No. 4 (2015)

Keyboard

- Piano Sonata (1985–1986)
- Luces and Sombras, 5 Tangos for piano (1999)
- Con mortuis in lingua mortua, three pieces for organ (2000)
- Nachlese for piano (2010); commissioned by Walter Fink for his 80th birthday

== Recordings ==
Kirchner's mass Missa Moguntina was recorded in 1993, with soloists Maria Karb, Alison Browner, Mads Elung-Jensen, Johannes M. Kösters and Gregory Reinhart, organist Albert Schönberger, the Mainzer Domchor and Domkantorei St. Martin, and the Mainzer Domorchester, conducted by Mathias Breitschaft.

A recording of his quartet Exil for clarinet, violin, cello and piano, composed in 1995, was combined on a 2015 recording Beyond Time with Fabian Müller's Am Anfang for soprano and ensemble, and Messiaen's Quatuor pour la fin du temps.

In 2016, a recording of vocal chamber music was released entitled Media vita in morte sumus (In the midst of life we are in death) – vocal chamber music by Volker David Kirchner, containing three song collections, Obsidian-Gesänge on poems by Dana Obsidian for voice, horn, violin, cello and piano (2013), Es ist ein Weinen in der Welt, setting poems by Else Lasker-Schüler, for voice and piano (2011–2013), and Media vita in morte sumus on poems by Erich Michelsberg for soprano, clarinet, horn, piano and string trio (2006–2007).

== Awards ==
Kirchner received a prize from Rhineland-Palatinate for young composers in 1974, for his first opera Die Trauung. In 1977, he was awarded the Kunstpreis Rheinland-Pfalz and in 1992 the Gutenberg Plaque of Mainz. In 1994, Kirchner was the first recipient of the Rheingau Musik Preis of the RMF. In 1995, he received the composer's prize of the Niedersächsische Sparkassenstiftung and the Kreissparkasse Hannover, and in 2007, the Peter Cornelius Plaque of Rhineland-Palatinate, the highest honour of the state. In 2014, Kirchner was awarded the "Preis für die Verdienste um die Musikkultur" by the Landesmusikrat Rheinland-Pfalz, in connection with the premiere of the orchestral composition Der mythische Fluss played by the Landesjugendorchester Rheinland-Pfalz (State youth orchestra of Rhineland-Palatinate).
