= Mainzer Kammerorchester =

German chamber orchestra based in Mainz

The Mainzer Kammerorchester is a chamber orchestra based in Mainz, the capital of the German state Rhineland-Palatinate. It was founded in 1955 by Günter Kehr. Its members are mostly professional orchestra players, and some instrumental students. Depending on a project, between eight and 25 players are recruited from this pool. The orchestra toured the globe, especially during the first 30 years. They produced around 130 recordings, especially for broadcasters. After Kehr's death in 1989, Volker Müller succeeded him, the vice president of the Peter Cornelius Conservatory. When he retired in 2017, his wife Renate Kehr took over the leadership.
