= Staatstheater Braunschweig =

Theatre company and opera house in Braunschweig, Germany

Coordinates: 52°15′57″N 10°31′55″E

State Theatre of Brunswick
- Staatstheater Braunschweig
- Opernhaus am Hagenmarkt
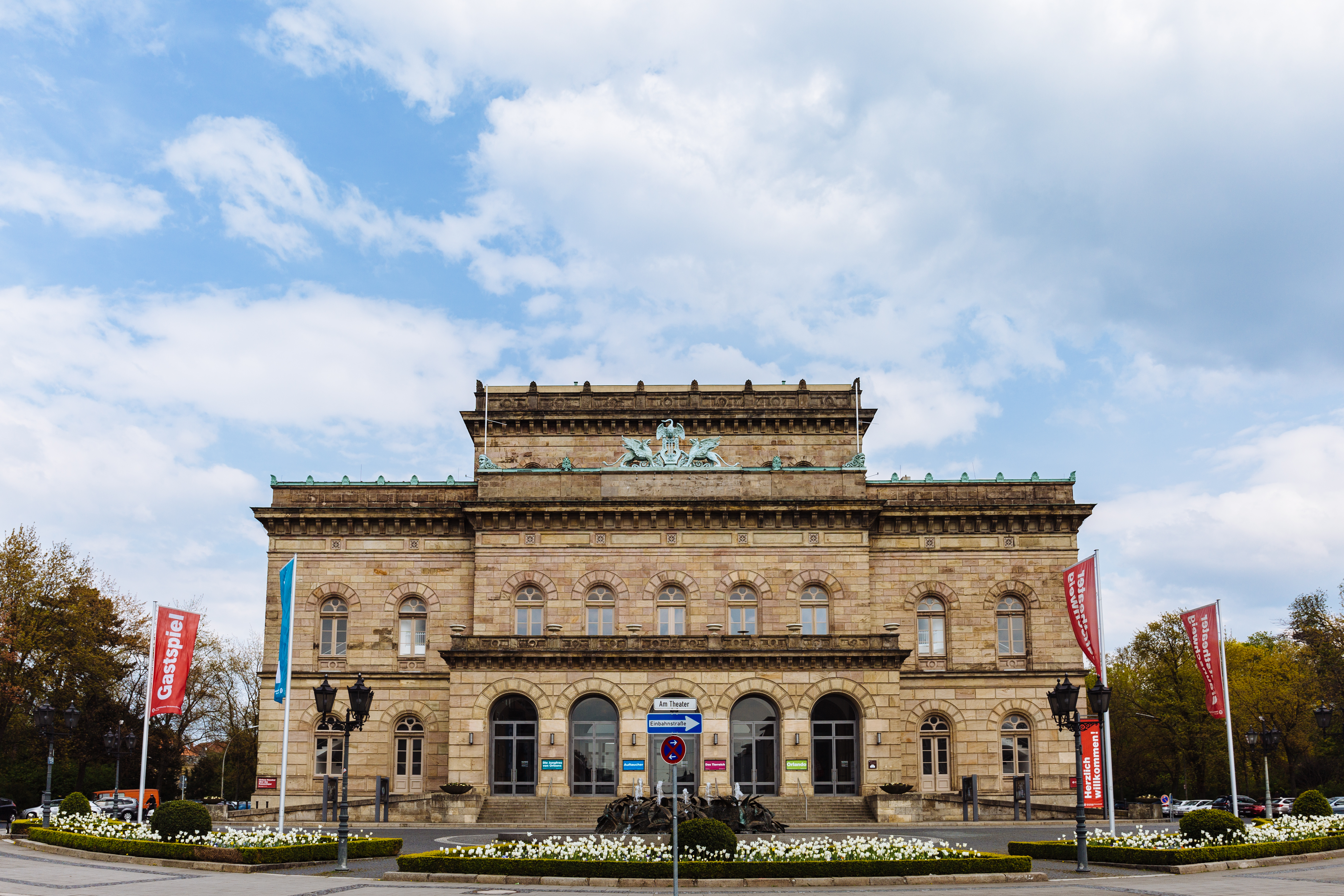
- "Great House" of Staatstheater with Cimiotti Fountain
- Interactive map of State Theatre of Brunswick
- Address: Braunschweig; Germany
- Owner: State of Lower Saxony
- Capacity: Großes Haus: 954; Kleines Haus: 297
- Designation: Listed Kulturdenkmal

Construction
- Opened: 1690; 336 years ago (Opernhaus am Hagenmarkt); 1861; 165 years ago (Staatstheater Braunschweig)
- Rebuilt: 1859; 167 years ago, Carl Wolf / Heinrich Ahlburg; 1945; 81 years ago
- Architect: Carl Wolf / Heinrich Ahlburg

Website
- staatstheater-braunschweig.de

The Staatstheater Braunschweig is a theatre company and opera house in Braunschweig, Germany, presenting and producing music theatre (opera, operetta, musical), Tanztheater, theatre, Theatre for Young Audiences and concerts.

The Staatstheater Braunschweig is owned by the State of Lower Saxony.

== History ==
The earliest incarnation of the Staatstheater Braunschweig was the Opernhaus am Hagenmarkt in Braunschweig, founded in 1690 by Duke Anthony Ulrich of Brunswick-Wolfenbüttel. Theatre works such as Emilia Galotti by Lessing and Goethe's Faust had their first openings in Braunschweig.

== Gallery ==
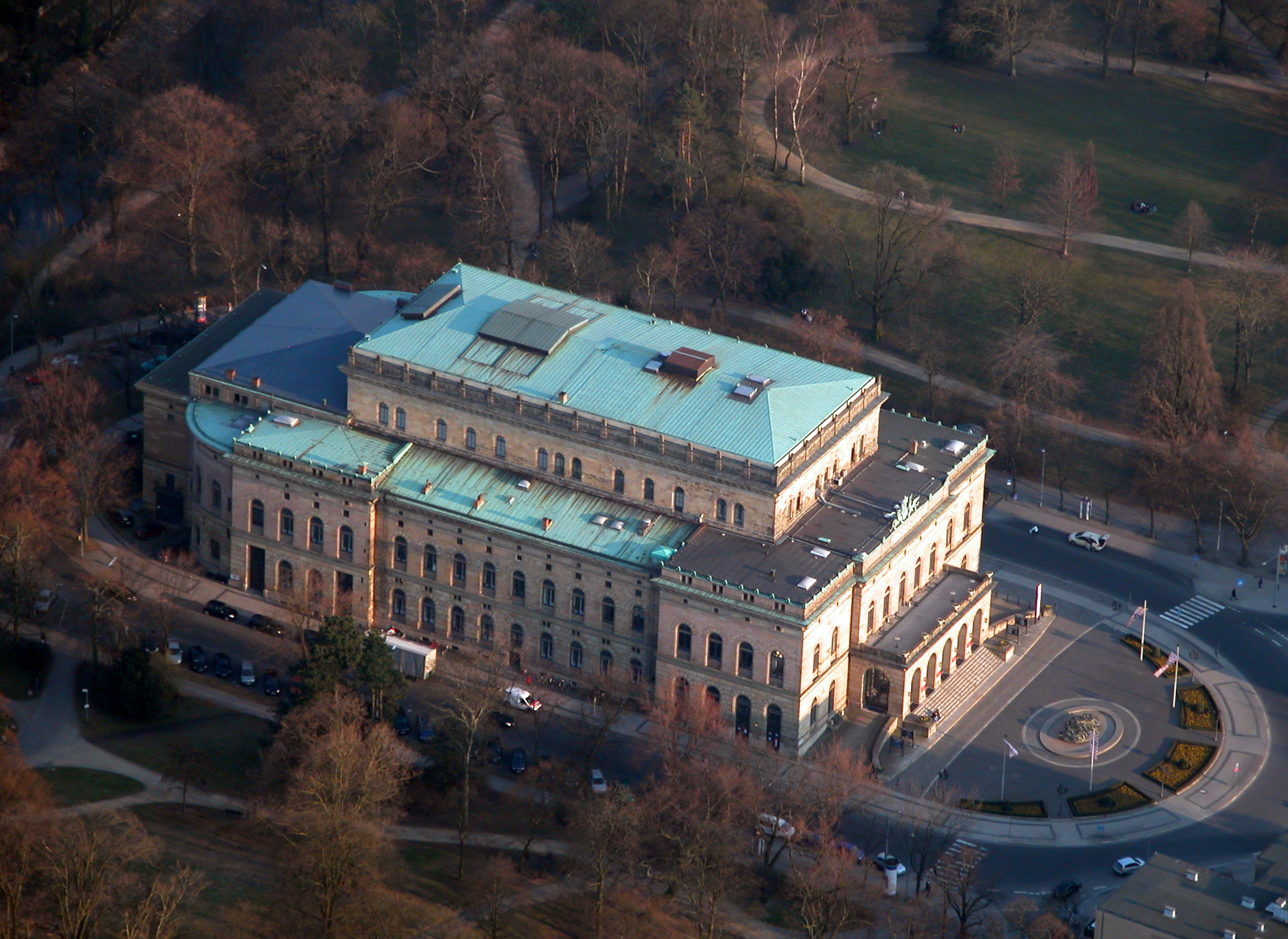
Aerial view

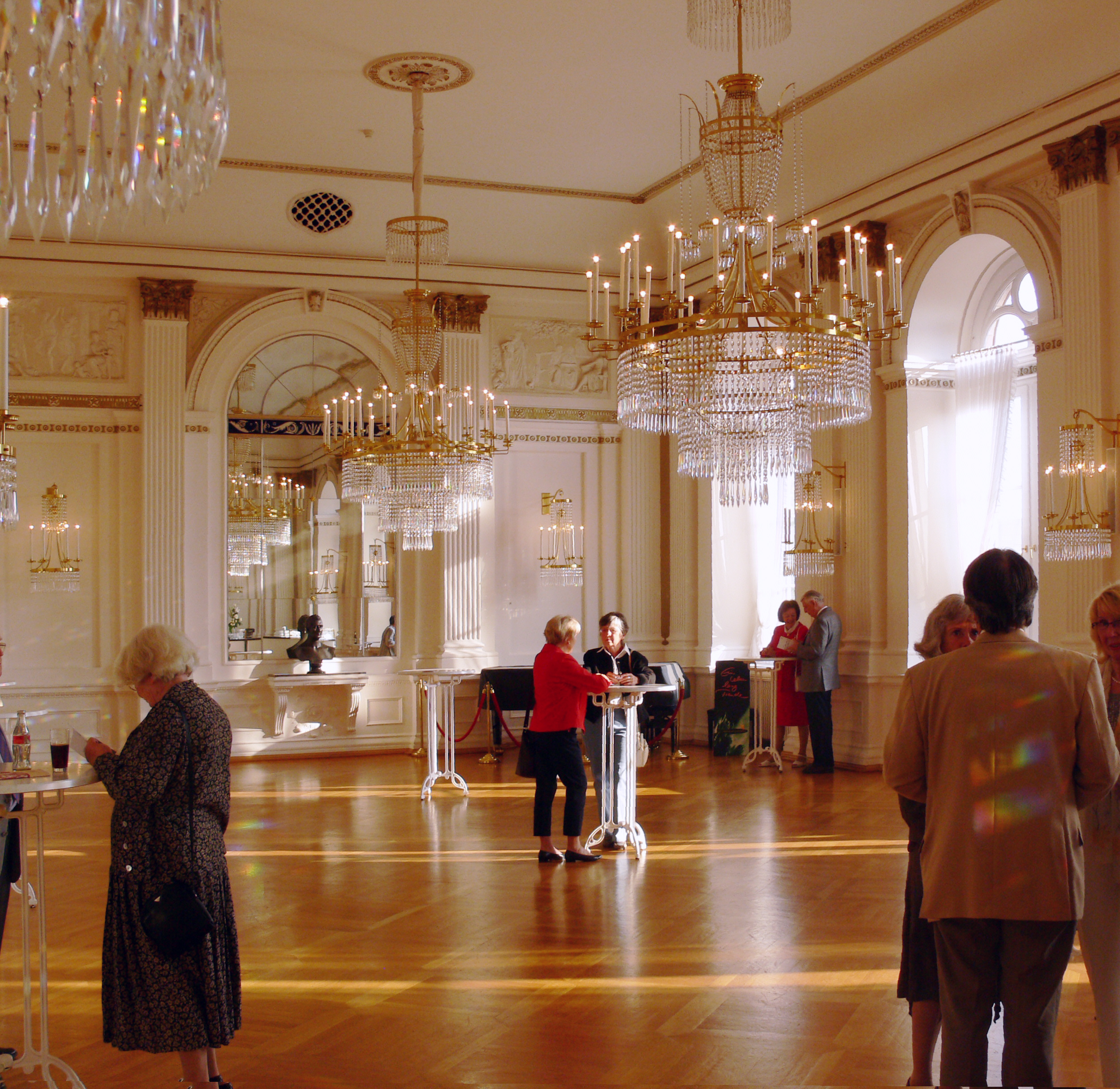
Foyer of "Great House"

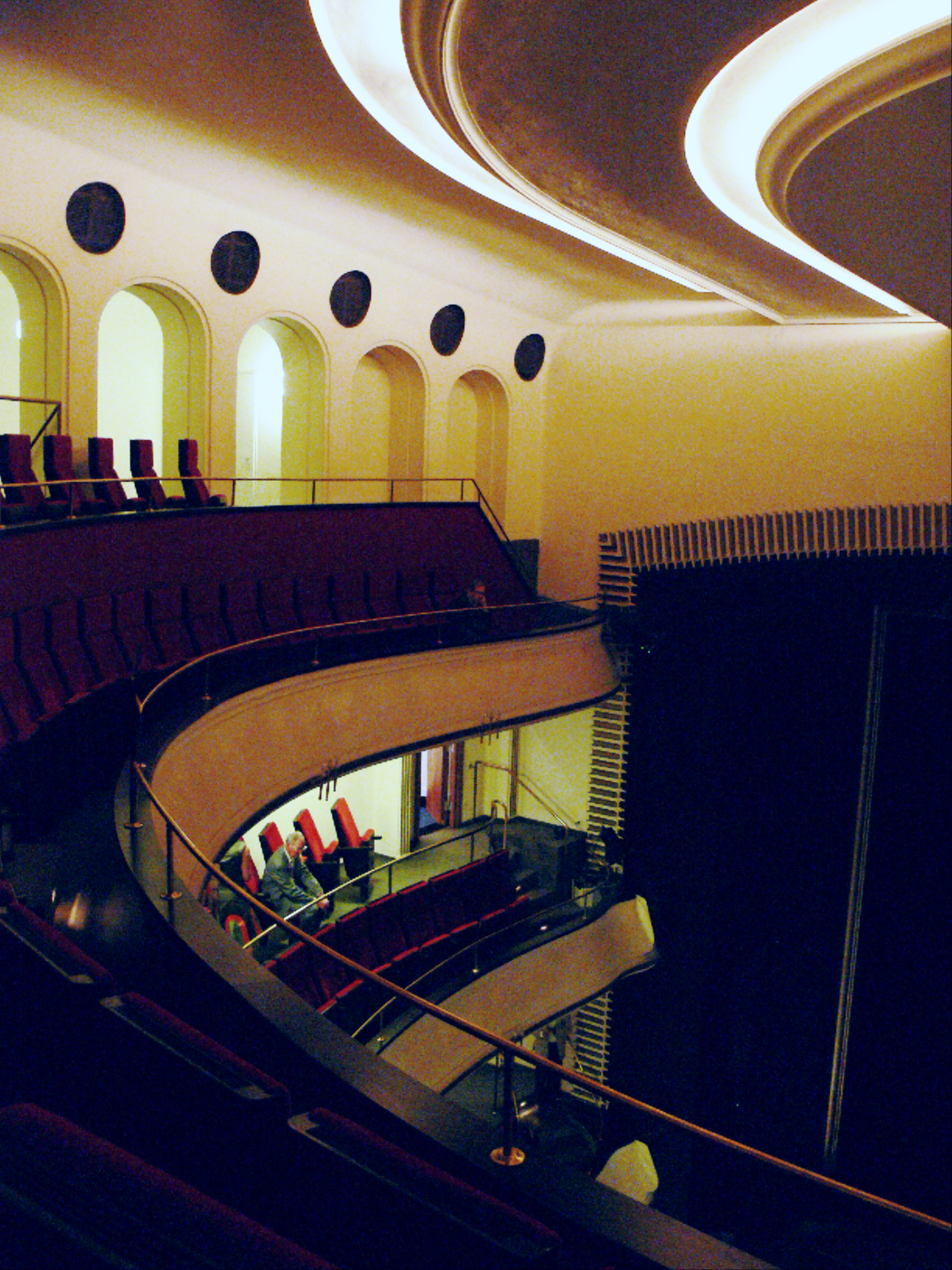
Auditorium of "Great House"

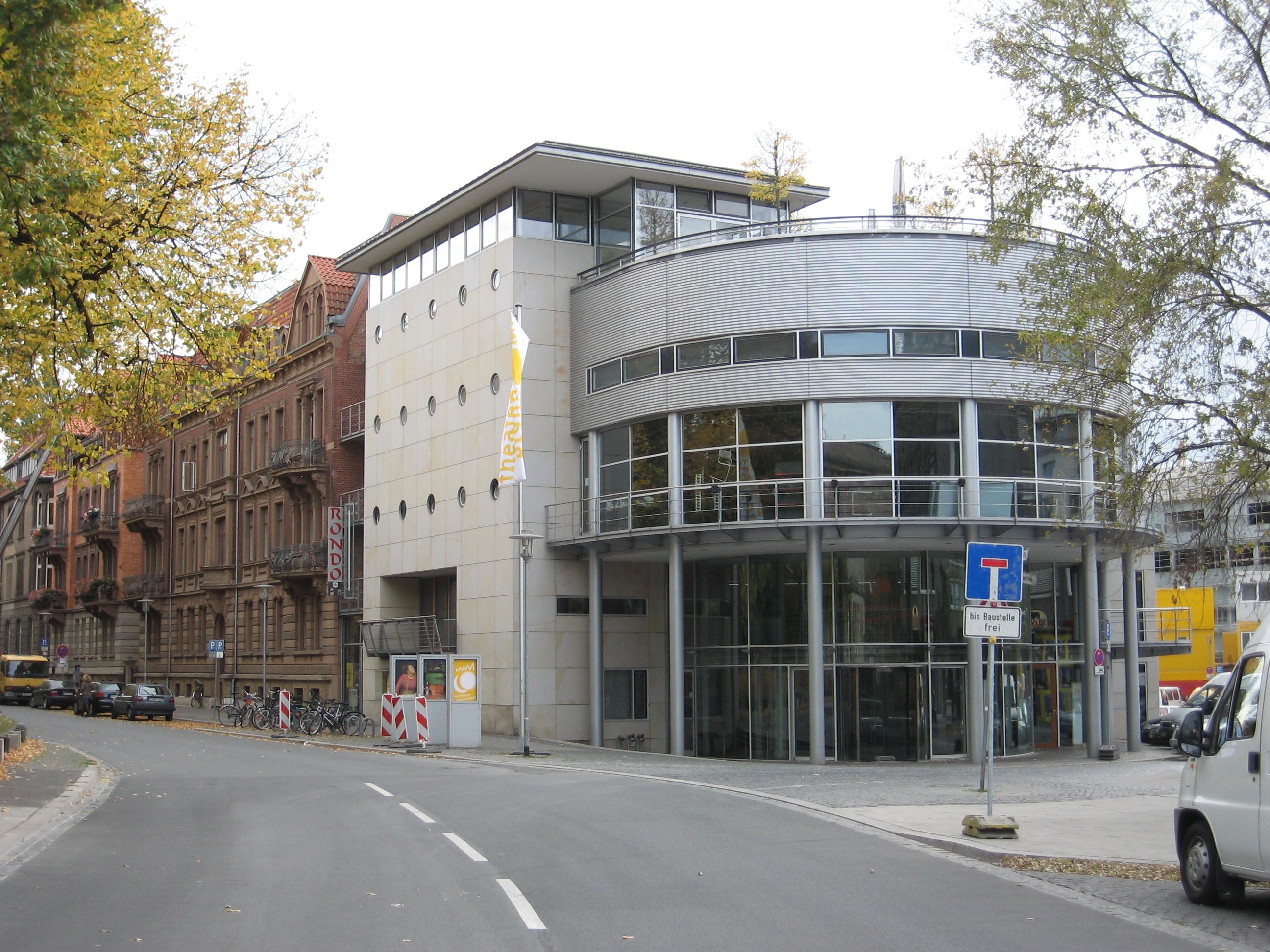
"Little House"

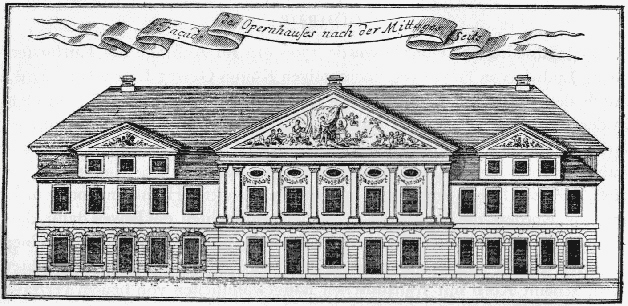
Opernhaus am Hagenmarkt

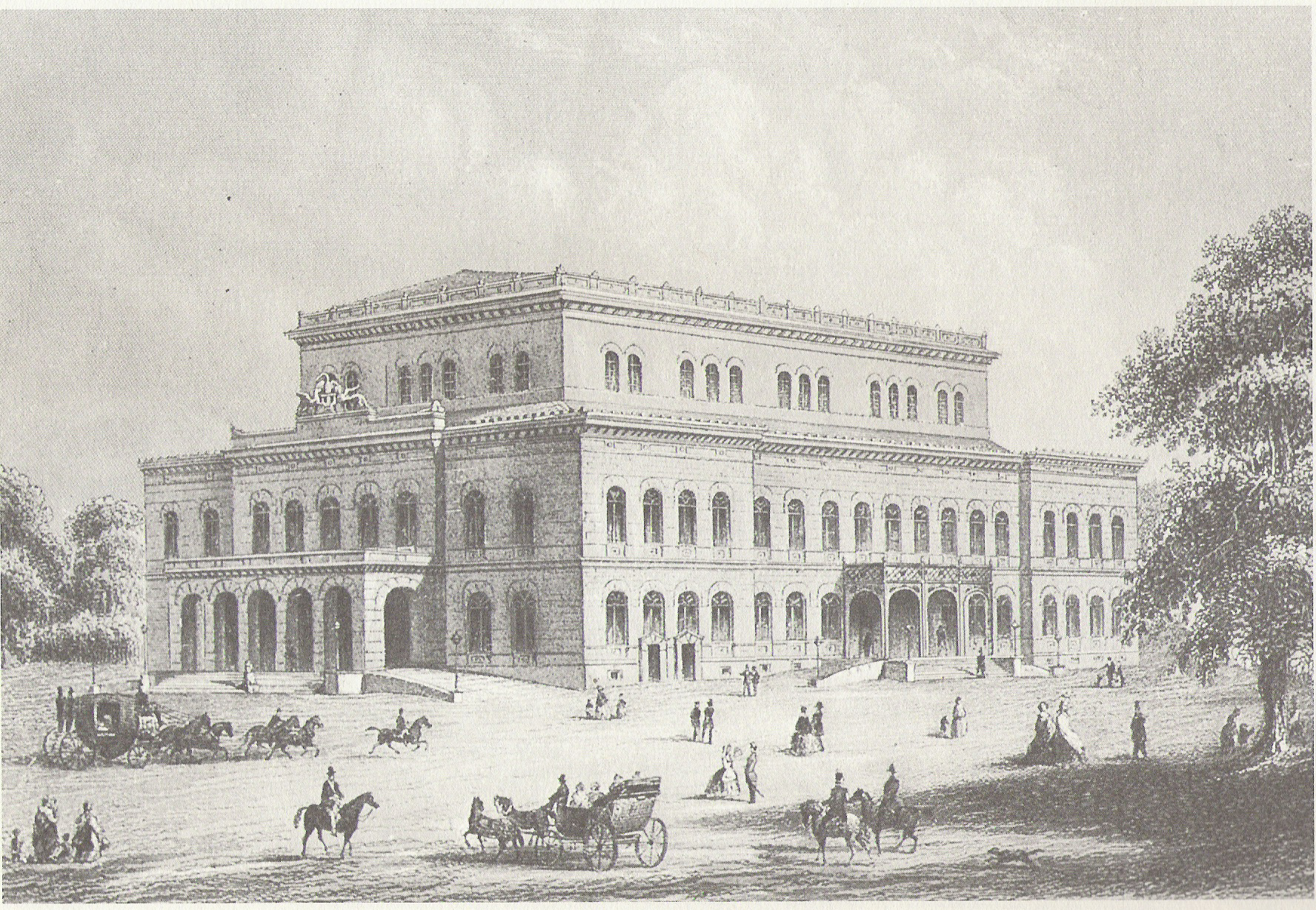
State Theatre in 1860

== Intendants ==
- 1925–29: Ludwig Neubeck
- 1929–33: Thur Himmighoffen
- 1933–34: Oskar Walleck
- 1934–45: Alexander Schum
- 1945–46: Jost Dahmen
- 1946–47: Heinrich Voigt
- 1947–51: Walter Bruno Iltz
- 1951–61: Hermann Kühn
- 1961–63: Erich Kriebig
- 1964–67: Helmuth Matiasek
- 1967–68: Hermann Kühn
- 1968–72: Hans Peter Doll
- 1972–79: Chritoph Groszer
- 1979–91: Mario Krüger
- 1991–93: Hans Peter Doll
- 1993–94: Jürgen Flügge
- 1995–97: Executive directors: Brigitte Fassbaender, Philippe Auguin, Tatjana Rese
- 1997–2010: Wolfgang Gropper
- 2010–2017: Joachim Klement
- 2017–present: Dagmar Schlingmann
