= Salzburger Landestheater =

Theatre and opera house in Salzburg, Austria

Salzburg State Theatre
- Das Salzburger Landestheater
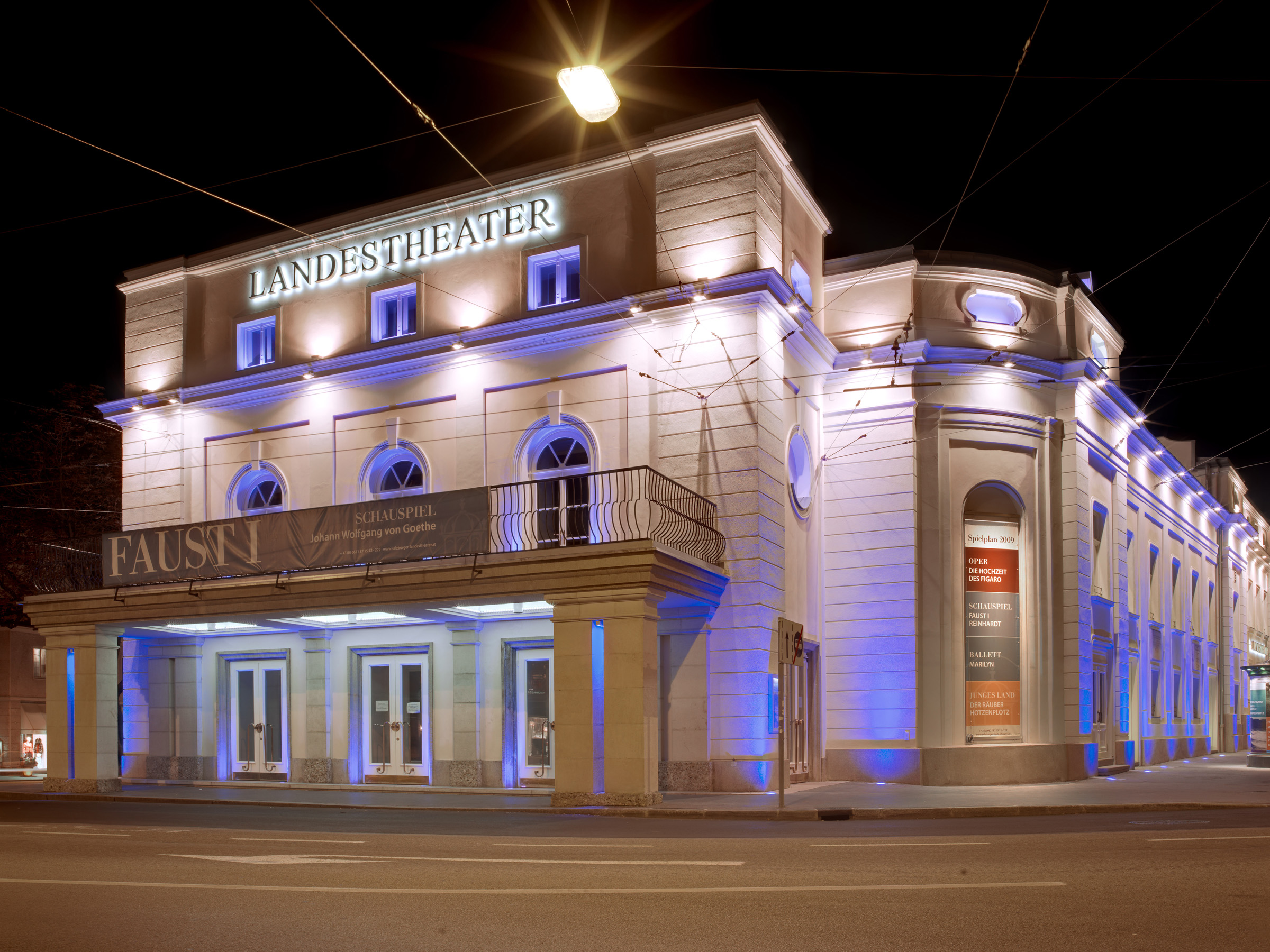
- Salzburg State Theatre
- Interactive map of Salzburg State Theatre
- Address: Schwarzstraße 22, 5020
- Location: Salzburg, Austria
- Coordinates: 47°48′10″N 13°2′34″E
- Capacity: 707

Construction
- Built: 1892–1893
- Opened: 1 October 1893
- Architect: Fellner & Helmer

Website
- https://www.salzburger-landestheater.at/en/start/index.html

The Salzburg State Theatre (Salzburger Landestheater) is a theatre situated in Salzburg, Austria, a venue for opera, theatre, and dance, contemporary and older works, with resident companies of actors, singers and dancers. The theatre presents approximately 400 performances each season, from September to June. The main theatre building is located next to the Mirabell Gardens and seats an audience of 707. The staff consists of 340 people originating from 35 countries.

The theatre is a listed building and part of the historic Altstadt, a UNESCO World Heritage Site.

== History ==
In 1775, Prince Archbishop Colloredo built the 'Prince Archbishop Court Theatre' on the site of the former ballroom of 1625. The official opening of the building was celebrated with Christian Heinrich Schmid’s Die Gunst des Fürsten which, beholden to enlightenment, was soon followed by Schiller’s dramas. Emanuel Schikaneder was engaged as director of the Court Theatre for several years. During this time, he became acquainted with the Mozart family, whom he regularly invited to his box. Mozart's music was performed there for the first time in 1776. With the staging of Die Entführung aus dem Serail in 1784, regular performances of Mozart's repertoire began.

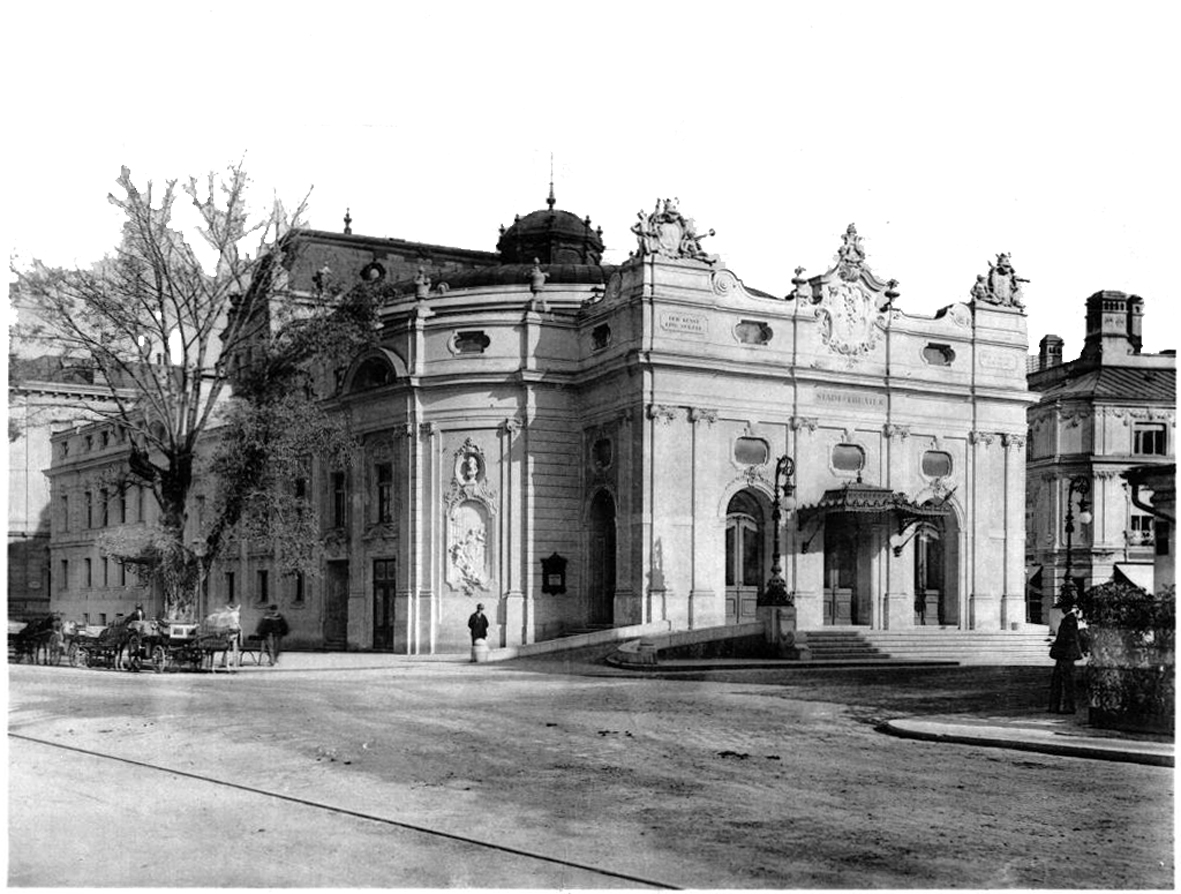
State Theater Salzburg, built by Fellner and Helmer

The present building was constructed between 1892 and 1893, designed by the architect duo Fellner & Helmer. The building was opened on October 1, 1893 with the overture from Mozart’s La clemenza di Tito. In this year, Max Reinhardt had been engaged as an actor in the company, and later co-founded the Salzburg Festival. Because of the Second World War, the theatre was closed in 1944. In 1945, American forces used the theatre as a radio studio. After the war, the theatre was opened to the public again.

With the introduction of the Studio Theatre in the former Mirabell Casino building in October 1971, the theatre acquired a new stage. Since 2010, there has been a close cooperation between the Salzburger State Theatre and the Salzburger Marionette Theatre. Besides joint productions, the theatre company also performs new productions in the Marionette Theatre’s space, now known as Bühne 24.

Additionally, Salzburg’s Festival Theatres serve as performance locations for State Theatre productions throughout the year while the State Theatre building is used for Salzburg Festival productions during the festival season in the summer months. Another close partnership affiliates the State Theatre with the Mozarteum Orchestra Salzburg which takes on the role of resident orchestra for the Theatre's musical productions.

Lutz Hochstraate, Intendant of the theatre from 1986 to 2004, introduced the programme for young audiences. From 2004 to 2009, Peter Dolder was Intendant, and had a particular focus on the works of Thomas Bernhard. The current Intendant of the theatre is Carl Philip von Maldeghem, since 2009. The current director of opera is Katrin König, and the theatre's music director is Leslie Suganandarajah.

== Directors (Intendanten; partial list) ==
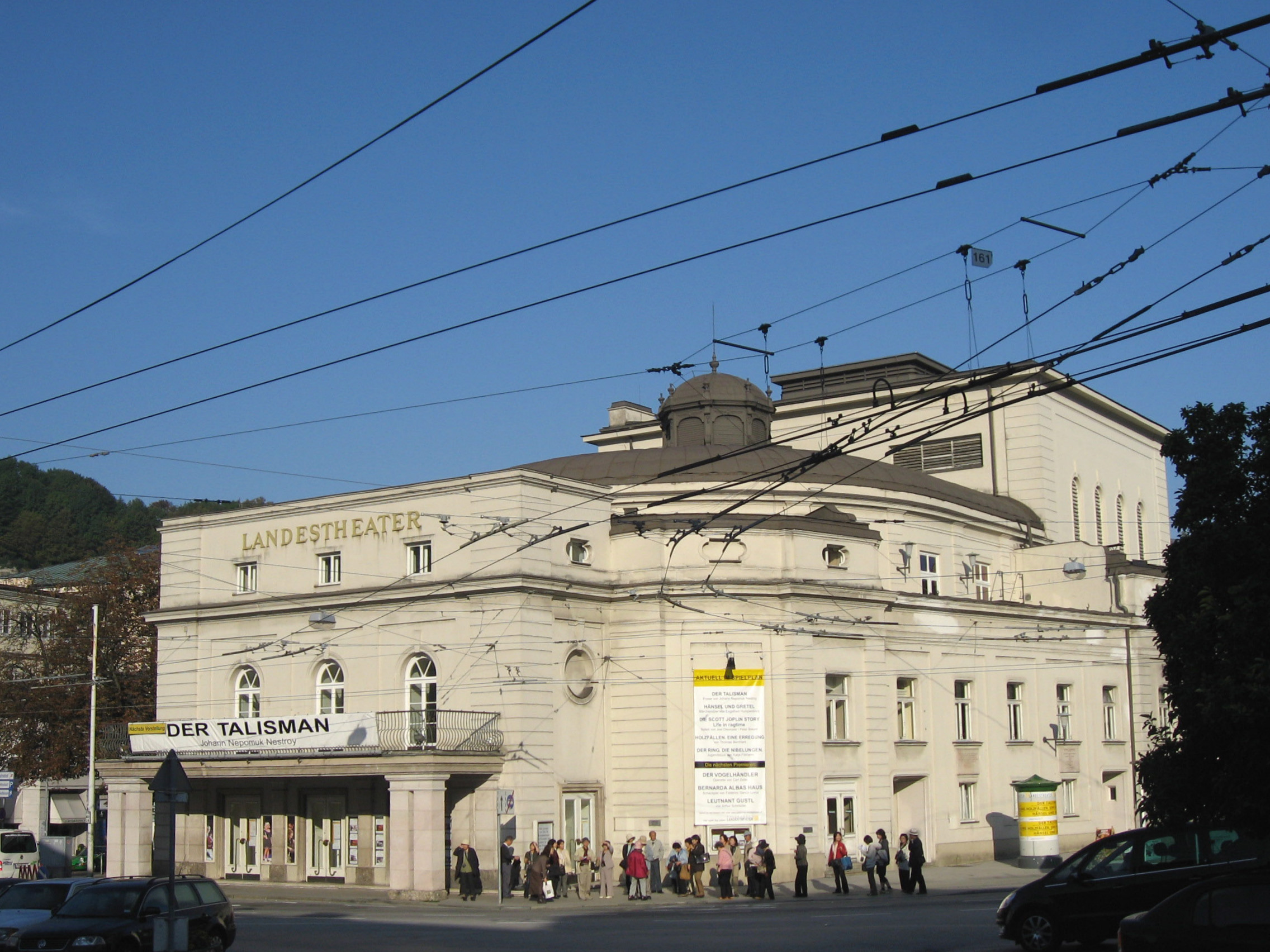
The Salzburg State Theater (2007)

- Emanuel Schikaneder (1780)
- Franz Anton von Weber (1795)
- Peter Stanchina (1951–1957)
- Fritz Klingenbeck (1957–1962)
- Hellmuth Matiasek (1962–1964)
- Fritz Herterich (1964–1967)
- Gandolf Buschbeck (1967–1974)
- Karlheinz Haberland (1974–1981)
- Federik Mirdita (1981–1986)
- Lutz Hochstraate (1986–2004)
- Peter Dolder (2004–2009)
- Carl Philip von Maldeghem (2009–present)
