= Kunstpreis Rheinland-Pfalz =

German art award

The Kunstpreis Rheinland-Pfalz is a prize awarded annually by the German state of Rheinland-Pfalz for outstanding achievement in the arts and alternates between the areas of visual arts, music, theatre, performing arts, film, and literature. The recipients must have a connection to the state either by birth, residence or their artistic work there and are selected by a jury. The prize was established in 1956 with the sculptor Emy Roeder as its first recipient. As of 2019, the main prize is an award of €10,000. There is also a Förderpreise (support prize) of €7,500 for outstanding young artists.

== Past recipients ==
Past recipients include:

- 1956 – Emy Roeder, sculptor
- 1957 – Carl Zuckmayer, writer
- 1975 – Joseph Breitbach, writer
- 1977 – Volker David Kirchner, composer
- 1990 – Lothar Fischer, sculptor
- 1995 – Erwin Wortelkamp, sculptor and painter
- 2000 – Edgar Reitz, filmmaker
- 2002 – Martin Schläpfer, dancer and choreographer
- 2006 – Thomas Lehr, writer
- 2007 – Hansgünther Heyme, theatre director
- 2008 – Fauré Quartet
- 2009 – Ursula Krechel, writer
- 2010 – Heiner Goebbels, composer
