= Jacqueline Eymar =

French pianist

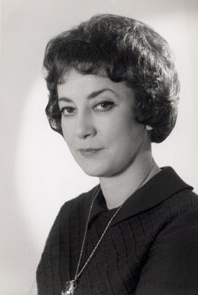
Jacqueline Eymar

Jacqueline Eymar (23 June 1922 – 6 December 2008) was a French classical pianist.

== Biography ==
Born in Nice, a pupil of the pianist and composer Yves Nat, Eymar had a rich post-war career as a pianist and chamber musician.

Eymar has interpreted a wide and varied repertoire, in which the romantic period (Brahms, Schumann, Schubert…) and French music (Debussy, Fauré, Franck…) occupied a prominent place. Soloist with the Orchestre national and the Orchestre de la Radiotélévision française, she was also a regular of the major Parisian associations, playing for the Orchestre de la Société des Concerts du Conservatoire or in the framework of concerts Colonne and concerts Lamoureux. She has toured extensively in Europe, the USSR (1958, 1961, 1967), Southeast Asia (1965) and America (1971), offering piano recitals and chamber music concerts.

In addition to her solo work, Jacqueline Eymar has devoted a significant part of her work to chamber music, actively collaborating with Günter Kehr – a German violinist and conductor - and with the Kehr trio, founded by the latter. At the time of the Franco-German reconciliation, they met in quartet and gave together many concerts in France, in Germany and in the world.

Critics recognized her for her exceptional power and elegance of play, most often praising her architectural design of the works. On March 30, 1960, René Dumesnil wrote in Le Monde: "I have rarely seen such complete possession of a performer through the music she animates." On February 13, 1965, composer Luc-André Marcel addressed her in these terms: "The way in which you illuminate such and such a detail, of which you make emerge such and such a second level, of which you lead a crescendo, is of such evidence that one cannot not listen. Moreover, the extreme beauty of the sound and the astonishing variety of colours, the total absence of arbitrary, gratuitous virtuosity, add to this impression of hearing pure music."

Eymar has given great importance to contemporary composers, introducing French and foreign audiences to artists such as André Jolivet, Georges Migot, Serge Nigg, Antoine Tisné, Marius Constant and Luc-André Marcel, whose two piano concertos she created. In 1960, in the Salle Pleyel in Paris, she performed the piano concerto of Khachaturian (1926), the composer conducting the National Orchestra.

In the 1980s, she retired to her family home in Pourrières (Var), reserving her performances for an audience of music-loving friends. She died there on December 6, 2008.

== Discography ==
In 1961, she won the Grand Prix de l'Académie nationale du disque for the recording of Le Zodiaque by Georges Migot (1932). The recording made in 1959-1960, then published in the form of two albums (Lumen LD 3443/3445) was the subject of a second edition in 1984 (Cybelia CY 665-666) and then a CD release in 2005 (Intégral). Jacqueline Eymar's recordings are rare. Albums containing works by César Franck (Philips N 00.597 L) and Fauré, Brahms and Debussy in the series "Pages célèbres" (Le Chant du Monde LD-M-8168, LD-S-8198 and LD-S-8169). The Brahms, Fauré and Debussy records were reissued on a single CD by Forgotten Records (http://forgottenrecords.com/) and Sakuraphon ( https://www.sakuraphon.net/). In addition, her interpretation of César Franck's quintet in F minor for piano and strings with the Loewenguth Quartet (Philips L 00.381 L, 1958, recording of 1955, followed by Prélude, Choral and Fugue) remains a reference despite the years. This recording has just been republished by Forgotten Records. With the Kehr trio, she has made numerous radio recordings in Paris (ORTF) and in Germany. (Südwestrundfunk Mainz Stuttgart, Westdeutscher Rundfunk Köln, Norddeutscher Rundfunk Hannover in particular). Together, they also recorded on disc Brahms's three quartets (Da Camera Magna, Heidelberg, 1968) and Fauré's four quartets and quintets (1966/1970) Heinz Jansen, Südwest Tonstudio). This last disc was transcribed on CD in 1992 (VoxBox).

== Publication ==
- Maîtrise du clavier, Paris, 1974.
