= Günter Kehr =

German violinist and conductor (1920–1989)

- Born: 16 March 1920; Darmstadt, Germany
- Died: 22 September 1989 (aged 69); Mainz, Germany
- Education: Musikhochschule Köln
- Occupations: Violinist; Chamber musician; Academic teacher
- Organizations: Kehr Trio; Peter Cornelius Conservatory; Mainzer Kammerorchester; Musikhochschule Köln

Günter Kehr (16 March 1920 – 22 September 1989) was a German violinist, conductor and academic teacher of violin and chamber music. He founded the Kehr Trio, a string trio, and the Mainzer Kammerorchester, a chamber orchestra, and toured internationally with both ensembles. Kehr was director of the Peter Cornelius Conservatory in Mainz from 1953, and professor at the Musikhochschule Köln.

== Life ==
Born in Darmstadt, Kehr studied the violin as well as musicology in Berlin and Cologne with Alma Moodie and Hermann Zitzmann. He received his doctorate in 1941 with the thesis: Untersuchungen zur Violintechnik um die Wende des 18. Jahrhunderts, exploring violin technique around 1800.

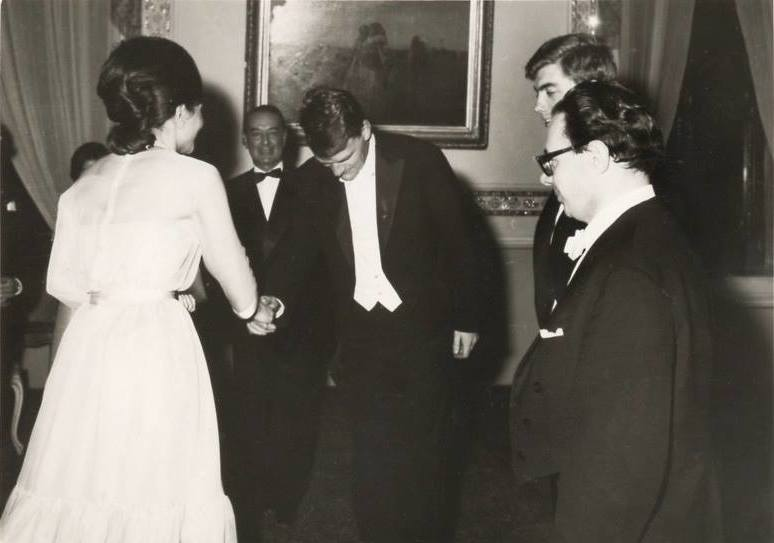
After a concert of the Kehr Trio at the Marble Palace in Tehran on 13 April 1965, Farah Diba greets (from left) cellist Bernhard Braunholz, violist Volker David Kirchner and Kehr.

In 1948, Kehr founded the Kehr Trio, a string trio which played for decades in changing formations. In 1950 and 1951, they took part in the Darmstädter Ferienkurse of contemporary music, where Kehr was a violin instructor from the beginning in 1946. With violist Georg Schmidt and cellist Kurt Herzbruch, they played Ernst Krenek's string trio, and Felix Petyrek's Gethsemane for female voice and string trio, with Ilona Steingruber. The trio toured in South America, North Africa and the Near East. They played concerts such as in Basel in 1959, with violist again Schmidt and cellist Hans Münch-Holland, performing string trios by Beethoven, Ernst von Dohnányi, and Max Reger. In the 1960s, the trio was formed by Kehr and his former students, violist Volker David Kirchner and cellist Bernhard Braunholz, on tours including Tehran. In 1968, they recorded the piano quartets by Johannes Brahms with pianist Jacqueline Eymar.

Kehr directed the Peter Cornelius Conservatory in Mainz from 1953. He increased the quality of the conservatory by hiring notable researchers. He also taught as professor of chamber music at the Hochschule für Musik und Tanz Köln from 1967 to 1986.

In 1955, Kehr founded the Mainzer Kammerorchester chamber orchestra, which he led until his death. With them, he was soloist and conductor, performing on numerous tours in Europe, North and South America, Africa and Asia. They made around 130 recordings, especially for the broadcaster SWR, but also for WDR, NDR, Hessischer Rundfunk and other stations, with a repertoire from early Baroque to contemporary. They produced the first recording of Rinaldo da Capua's 1753 opera La zingara in 1966. In 1985, they played at Carnegie Hall in New York City, with a program of a Boccherini symphony, Mozart's Piano Concerto No. 9, with Nina Tichman as the soloist, Haydn's Symphony No. 49 "La Passione", and Bartók's Romanian Folk Dances. A review in The New York Times noted the ensemble's "sweet, singing string sound".

Kehr died in Mainz at age 69.
