= Hellmuth Matiasek =

Austrian theatre and film director (1931–2022)

- Born: 15 May 1931; Vienna, Austria
- Died: 7 April 2022 (aged 90); Rosenheim, Bavaria, Germany
- Education: Max-Reinhardt-Seminar; University of Vienna
- Occupations: Stage director; Theatre manager
- Organizations: Salzburger Landestheater; Staatstheater Braunschweig; Otto-Falckenberg-Schule; Staatstheater am Gärtnerplatz; Bayerische Theaterakademie August Everding; Carl Orff-Festspiele Andechs
- Spouses: First wife; Cornelia Froboess (m. 1967)
- Children: 2
- Awards: Order of Merit of the Federal Republic of Germany; Austrian Decoration of Honour for Science and Art; Bavarian Order of Merit

Hellmuth Matiasek ([ˈhɛlmuːt ˈmatjasɛk]; 15 May 1931 – 7 April 2022; also spelled Helmuth) was an Austrian theatre and film director, theatre manager and teacher. He founded a small avant-garde theatre in Vienna at age 22. After working at the Salzburger Landestheater as stage director, he became the company's intendant (managing director) in 1962, then the youngest intendant in German-speaking theatre. From 1983 to 1996, he was intendant of the Staatstheater am Gärtnerplatz in Munich, where he co-founded and later managed the drama school Bayerische Theaterakademie August Everding. He was close to the composer Carl Orff, and managed the Carl Orff-Festspiele Andechs.

== Life ==
=== Education ===
Born in Vienna, Matiasek studied acting at the Max-Reinhardt-Seminar of the University of Music and Performing Arts Vienna as well as theatre studies, musicology, German studies and philosophy at the University of Vienna. He completed his studies in 1958 with the promotion about Komik eines Clowns to Dr.phil.

=== Theatre ===
In 1953, Matiasek founded the avant-garde student theatre Kaleidoskop in Vienna (later: Atelier-Theater), and acted as its director. From 1960, he worked at the Städtische Bühnen Köln where Oscar Fritz Schuh was director. From 1962, he worked as director at the Salzburger Landestheater He became intendant (managing director) of the Salzburg theatre in 1962, then the youngest person in German-speaking theatre to achieve such a position. Around that time, he met the composer Carl Orff, whose works would be a constant in his productions. From 1964, Matiasek was general director of the Staatstheater Braunschweig, from 1978 he held the same position at the Wuppertaler Bühnen, and from 1983 to 1996 he was intendant of the Staatstheater am Gärtnerplatz in Munich. His last stage direction there was Verdi's last opera, Falstaff.

Matiasek was also artistic director of the Carl Orff-Festspiele Andechs in Andechs from 1997 to 2006. He directed all stage works for the festival dedicated to Carl Orff who is buried there, and made the event attractive beyond the region. He was simultaneously president of the Bayerische Theaterakademie August Everding.

Matiasek worked as a guest director at several theatres in Germany and abroad, including the Hamburgische Staatsoper, Deutsches Schauspielhaus in Hamburg, Bayerisches Staatsschauspiel in Munich, the Münchner Kammerspiele, the Staatstheater Stuttgart, the Burgtheater in Vienna, as well as the Bregenzer Festspiele. At the Salzburg Festival, he directed in 1967 Mozart's Ascanio in Alba in sets designed by Ekkehard Grübler and conducted by Leopold Hager.

=== Teaching activities and memberships ===
Matiasek was director of the Otto-Falckenberg-Schule in Munich from 1972 to 1978. He co-founded the Bayerische Theaterakademie August Everding in 1993, and became its president in 2000, after Everding's death. He was also involved in the International Theatre Institute (ITI). Matiasek was a member of the supervisory board of the Bundestheater-Holding and was program advisory board of the European Forum Alpbach.

=== Personal life ===
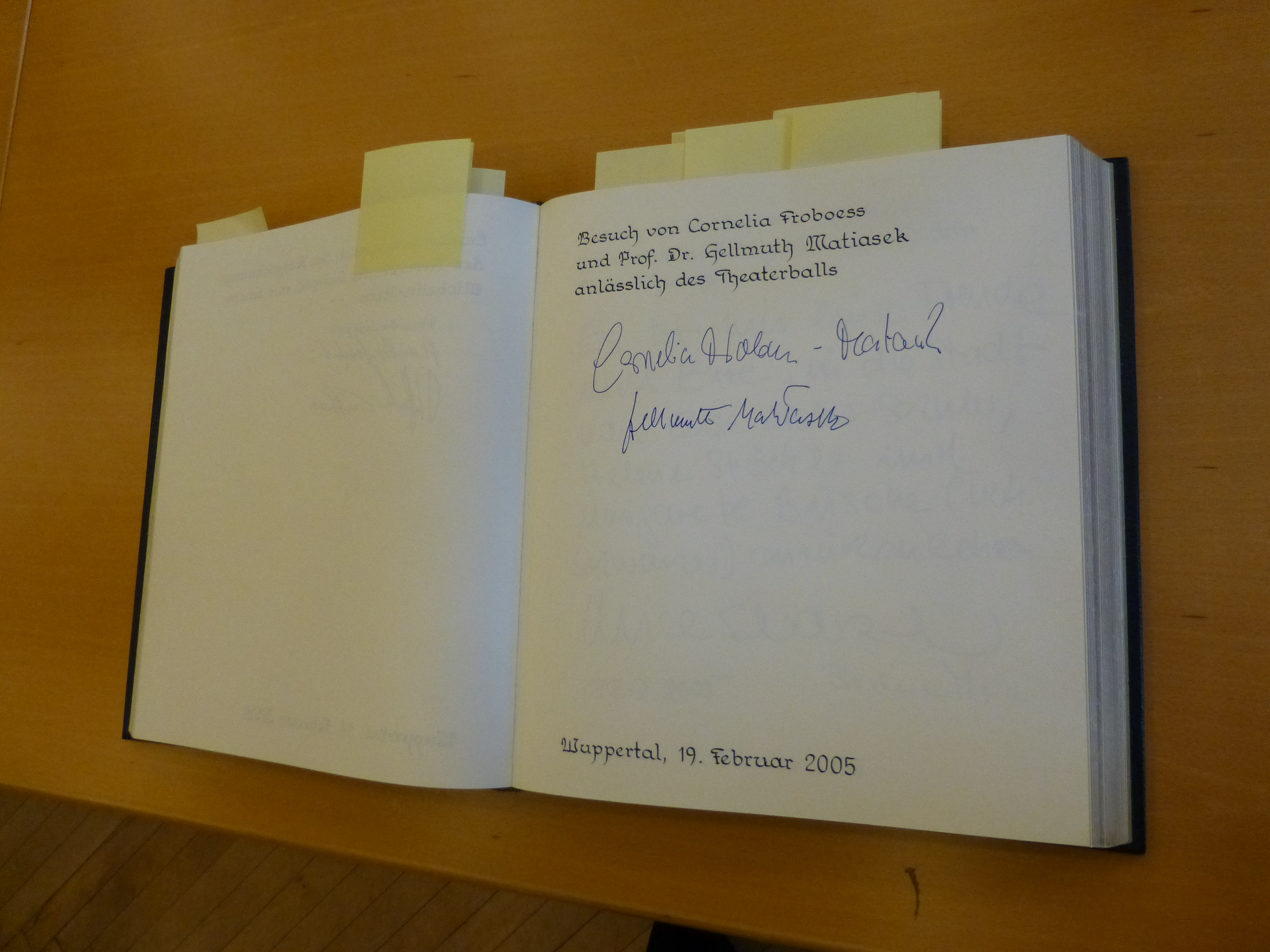
Document signed by Matiasek and his wife Cornelia Froboess

Matiasek was married from 1967, in second marriage, with the actress Cornelia Froboess. They settled in the countryside in Rosenheim. The couple had a daughter, Agnes, and a son, Kaspar.

Matiasek died in Rosenheim on 7 April 2022, at the age of 90.

== Publications ==
Matiasek wrote the libretto for a musical mystery play Das Salzburger Spiel vom verloren Sohn, about the Prodigal Son, based on old sources. With music by Wilfried Hiller for soloist, choir, children's choir and instrumental ensemble, it was published by Schott. The world premiere at the Kollegienkirche in Salzburg on 4 October 2015 was conducted by Wolfgang Götz.

== Honours ==
In 1963 Matiasek was awarded the Austrian Theaterdirektoren-Preis, in 1992 the Order of Merit of the Federal Republic of Germany first class and in 1993 the Austrian Decoration of Honour for Science and Art; in 1996 he was awarded the Bavarian Order of Merit; in 2003 he received the Oberbayerischer Kulturpreis and in 2008 the award Pro meritis scientiae et litterarum of Bavaria.
