= Pourrières =

- Commune
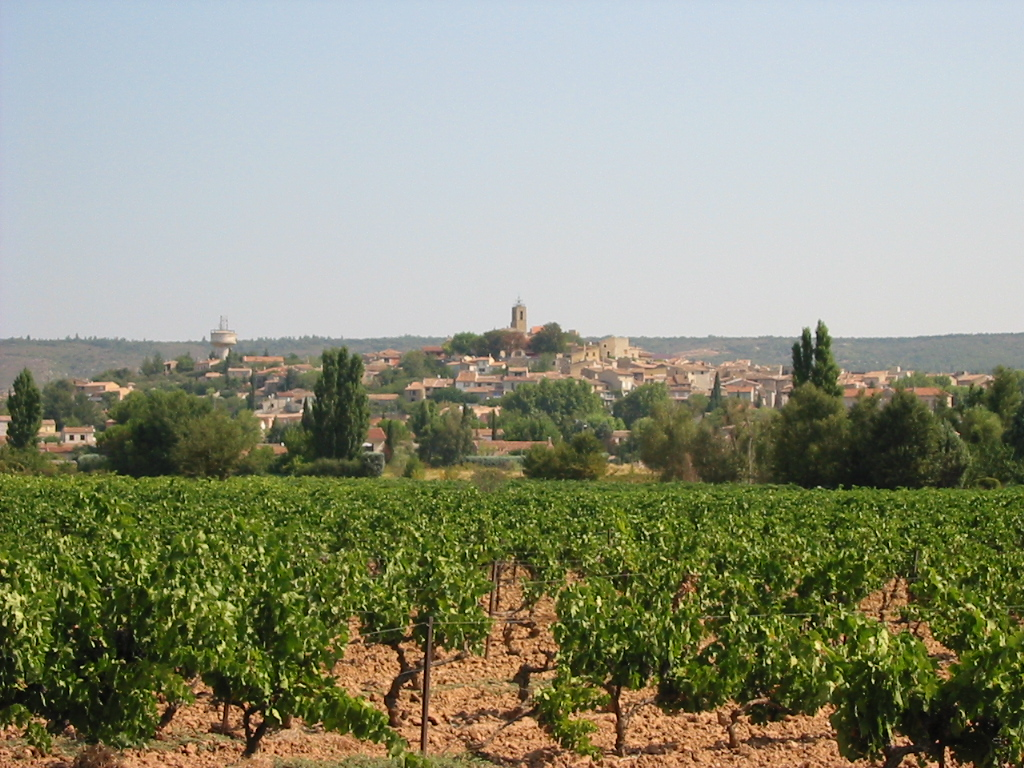
- A general view of the village

- Coat of arms
- Location of Pourrières
- Location within France Location within Provence-Alpes-Côte d'Azur
- Coordinates: 43°30′12″N 5°44′00″E
- Country: France
- Region: Provence-Alpes-Côte d'Azur
- Department: Var
- Arrondissement: Brignoles
- Canton: Saint-Maximin-la-Sainte-Baume
- Intercommunality: CA Provence Verte

Government
  - Mayor (2020–2026): Sébastien Bourlin
- Area^{1}: 56.32 km^{2} (21.75 sq mi)
- Elevation: 302 m (991 ft)
- Highest elevation: 872 m (2,861 ft)
- Lowest elevation: 239 m (784 ft)
- Population (2023): 5,642
  - Density: 100.2/km^{2} (259.5/sq mi)
- Time zone: UTC+01:00 (CET)
  - Summer (DST): UTC+02:00 (CEST)
- INSEE/Postal code: 83097 /83910
- ^{1} French Land Register data, which excludes lakes, ponds, glaciers > 1 km^{2} (0.386 sq mi or 247 acres) and river estuaries.

Pourrières (French pronunciation: [puʁjɛʁ]; Occitan: Porrieras) is a commune in the Var department in the Provence-Alpes-Côte d'Azur region in southeastern France.

== Population ==
Historical population
Year	Pop.	±% p.a.
1968	980	—
1975	1,270	+3.77%
1982	1,718	+4.41%
1990	2,631	+5.47%
1999	3,985	+4.72%
2007	4,443	+1.37%
2012	4,543	+0.45%
2017	5,155	+2.56%
2023	5,642	+1.52%
Source: INSEE

== Personalities ==
It is the home town of the French poet Germain Nouveau.

Jacqueline Eymar, classical pianist born in 1922, died in Pourrières in 2008.

== History ==
The name Pourrières, a commune in France's Var department, is widely believed to originate from the Latin phrase campi putridi, meaning "rotten fields" or "putrid fields". This name refers to the aftermath of a major battle in 102 BC where General Caius Marius defeated the Teutons, leaving numerous corpses. The remnants of the massive, historic battle where so many soldiers died that the plain became known for the decomposition of the fallen.

== See also ==
- Communes of the Var department
