= Hans-Peter Lehmann =

German opera and artistic director (1934–2025)

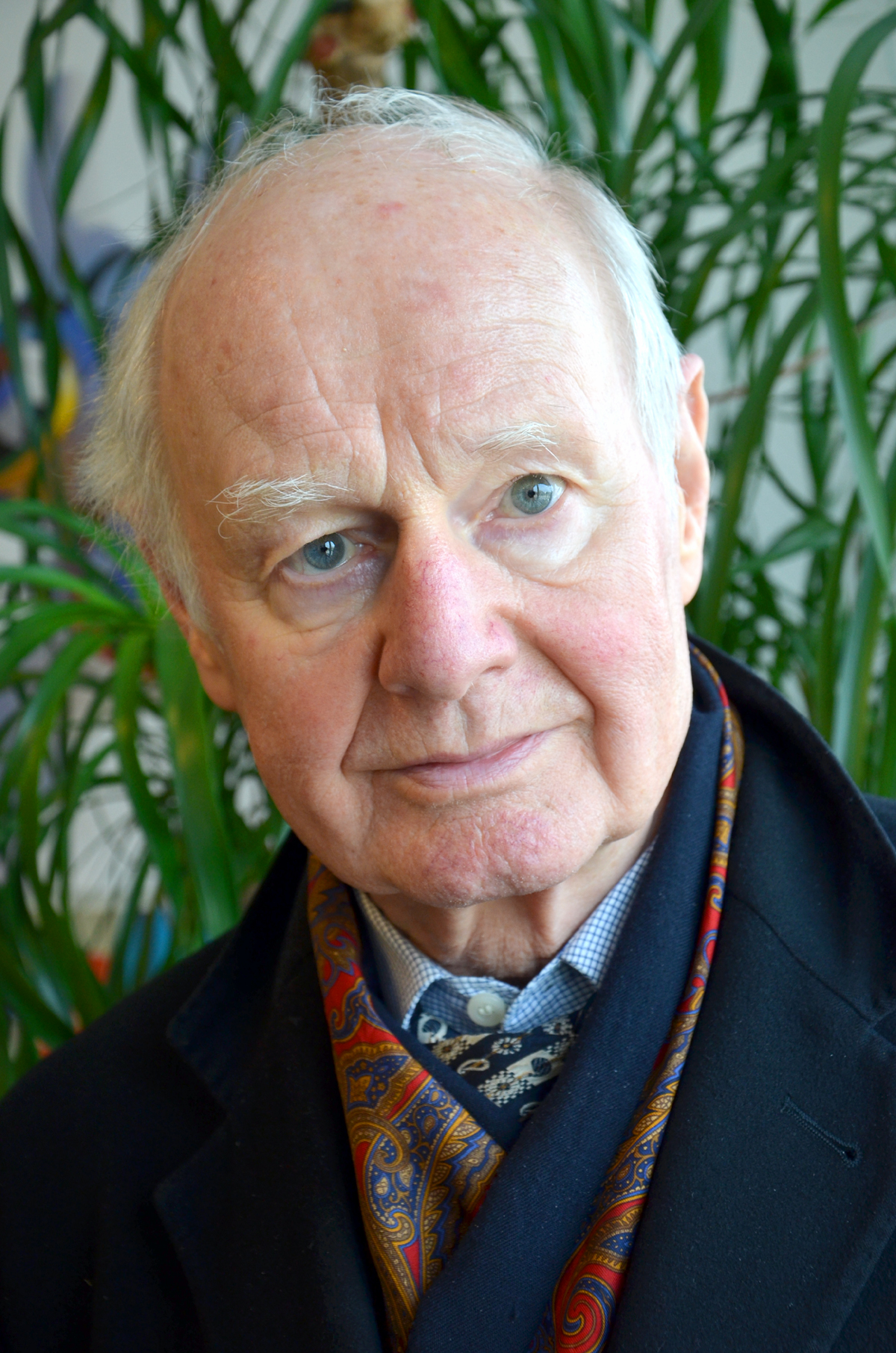
- Lehmann in 2014
- Born: 15 December 1934; Kassel, Germany
- Died: 5 February 2025 (aged 90); Munich, Bavaria, Germany
- Education: Hochschule für Musik Detmold; Free University of Berlin
- Occupations: Opera director; Intendant; Academic teacher
- Organizations: Staatsoper Hannover; Hochschule für Musik und Theater Hannover

Hans-Peter Lehmann (15 December 1934 – 5 February 2025) was a German opera and arts administrator. He served as intendant of the Staatsoper Hannover from 1980 to 2001. During that tenure, he directed 31 productions with a focus on the stage works by Richard Wagner and operas from the 20th century, both neglected works and new commissions. He was professor at the Hochschule für Musik und Theater Hannover.

== Life and career ==
Lehmann was born in Kassel on 15 December 1934, the son of the sculptor Kurt Lehmann and an art historian. In 1955, he passed his Abitur at the Waldorfschule in Hanover. He studied music, voice, flute and pantomime at the Hochschule für Musik Detmold from 1955 to 1957, and studied further musicology, art history and theatre studies at the Free University of Berlin from 1957 to 1958.

After his studies, Lehmann became assistant director of Carl Ebert and Gustav Rudolf Sellner at the new Deutsche Oper Berlin; he assisted Wieland Wagner and Wolfgang Wagner at the Bayreuth Festival between 1960 and 1973. After the death of Wieland Wagner in 1966, he took care of his artistic legacy, in productions in Bayreuth and on tours to Italy, France, Japan, and the US. In 1970, he staged Wagner's Tannhäuser at the Bavarian State Opera in Munich, and in 1974 Zimmermann's Die Soldaten at the Staatstheater Nürnberg. He worked as a director also in Mainz, Ulm, and Freiburg.

From 1976 to 1980, Lehmann worked in his first leading position as opera director at the Hessisches Staatstheater Wiesbaden. From 1980 to 2001, was opera director at the Staatsoper Hannover. He directed 31 productions during his tenure, often with George Alexander Albrecht as Generalmusikdirektor. He also was a guest director of performances in Essen, Frankfurt, Stuttgart, Amsterdam, Basel, Milan, Paris, Venice and Chicago.

In Hannover, he focused on directing works by Wagner, beginning with Parsifal in his first season there. His contacts to Bayreuth helped him to win singers such as Waltraud Meier and Siegfried Jerusalem. He also directed Lohengrin, Die Meistersinger von Nürnberg and the Ring cycle, and he engaged other directors for more stage works by Wagner. He had a strong sense for talent, giving singers such as Renate Behle, Johannes Martin Kränzle and Rainer Trost and director Herbert Wernicke the foundation for an international career.

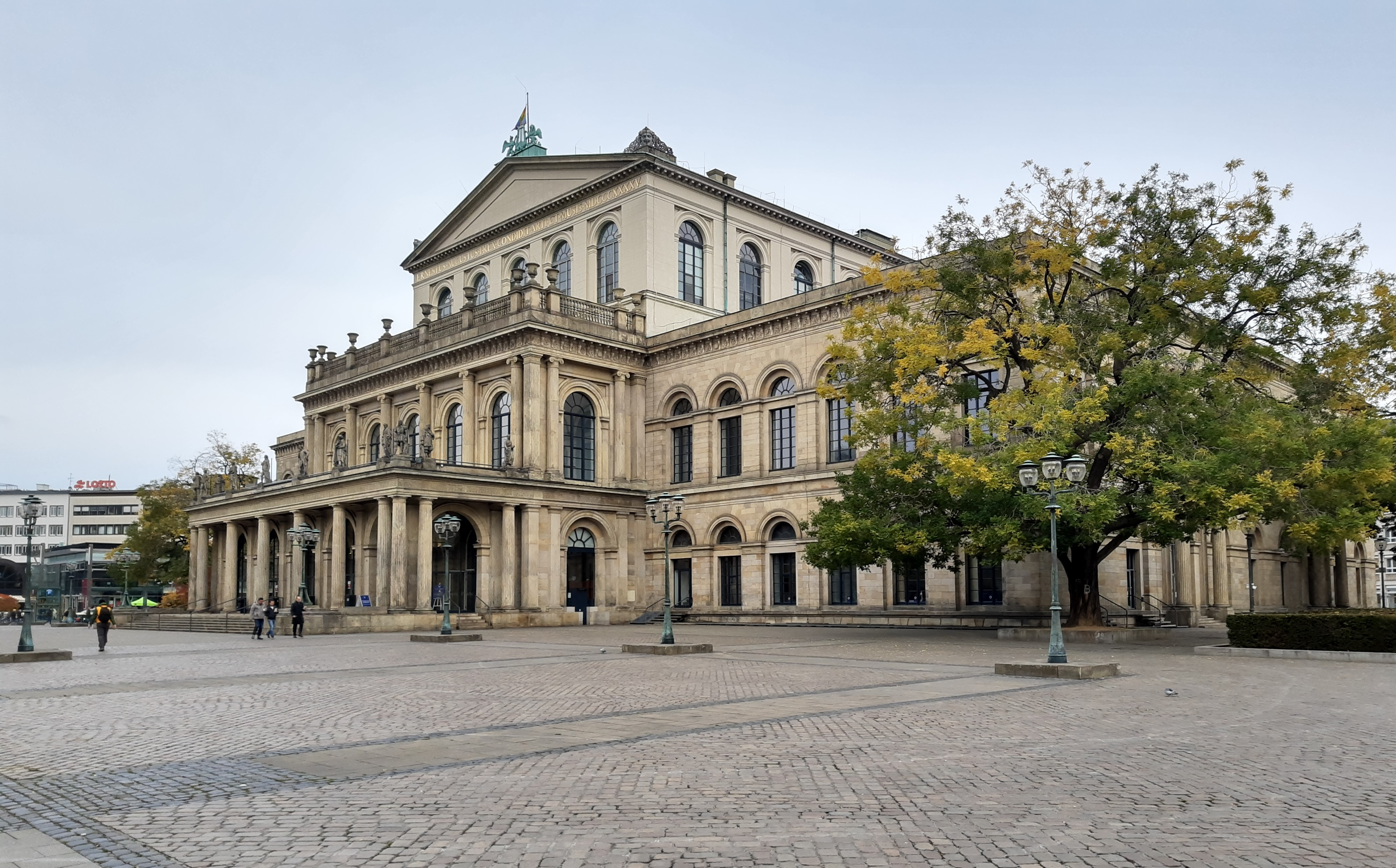
Staatsoper Hannover in 2023

Lehmann initiated a remodeling of the opera house to achieve better acoustics. During the construction time, the Theater am Aegi served as an interim opera house. The reopening of the Staatsoper took place with his production of Schoenberg's Moses und Aron. Lehmann introduced operas from the 20th century, against the initial resistance of the audience, including several world premieres and first performances. He directed Aribert Reimann's Troades, Bernd Alois Zimmermann's Die Soldaten, Zemlinsky's Eine florentinische Tragödie, Henze's König Hirsch, Alban Berg's Wozzeck, Pfitzner's Palestrina and the world premiere of a commissioned chamber opera by Xaver Paul Thoma, Draußen vor der Tür after Borchert's play. It was premiered in 1994 at the Ballhof theatre. Lehmann invited guests to direct other rarely played works from the period, for Wolf-Ferrari's Sly, Berg's Lulu, John Corigliano's Die Geister von Versailles, Reimann's Das Schloß, Martinů's Griechische Passion, Britten's Billy Budd, Ligeti's Le Grand Macabre and Schoeck's Penthesilea. In 2000, Lehmann directed the world premiere of Volker David Kirchner's Gilgamesh, commissioned for the Expo 2000, with stage design by Ekkehard Grübler and conducted by Stefan Sanderling.

Lehmann also programmed works related to Hanover, such as Steffani's Enrico Leone, works by Wolf-Ferrari and by Heinrich Marschner, whose Der Bäbu was played in a concert version, while he directed Hans Heiling. Lehmann completed his time in Hanover in 2001 directing a production of Hindemith's Mathis der Maler. He then became an honorary member of the Staatsoper Hannover.

After Wernicke died in 2002, Lehmann took over his direction of Wagner's Die Walküre at the Bavarian State Opera, following Wernicke's concept.

Lehmann was a professor at the Hochschule für Musik und Theater Hannover and a member of the Kuratorium der Bürgerstiftung Hannover, inspiring the cultural development of the city.

=== Personal life ===
Lehmann was married to the singer Erika Maria Lehmann. The couple had two sons.

Lehmann died on 5 February 2025, at the age of 90.
