= Germain Nouveau =

French poet of the symbolist movement (1851–1920)

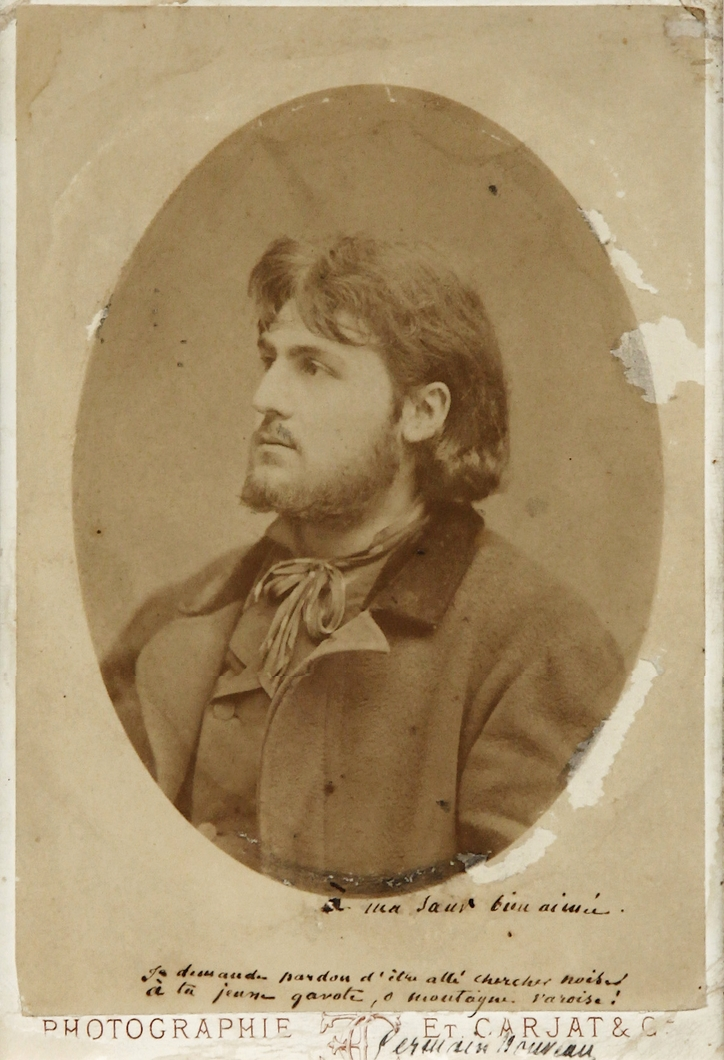
- Born: 31 July 1851 Pourrières, France
- Died: 1920 (aged 68–69) Pourrières, France
- Occupation: Poet
- Genre: Symbolist

Germain Marie Bernard Nouveau (French pronunciation: [ʒɛʁmɛ̃ maʁi bɛʁnaʁ nuvo]; 1851–1920) was a French poet associated with the symbolist movement.

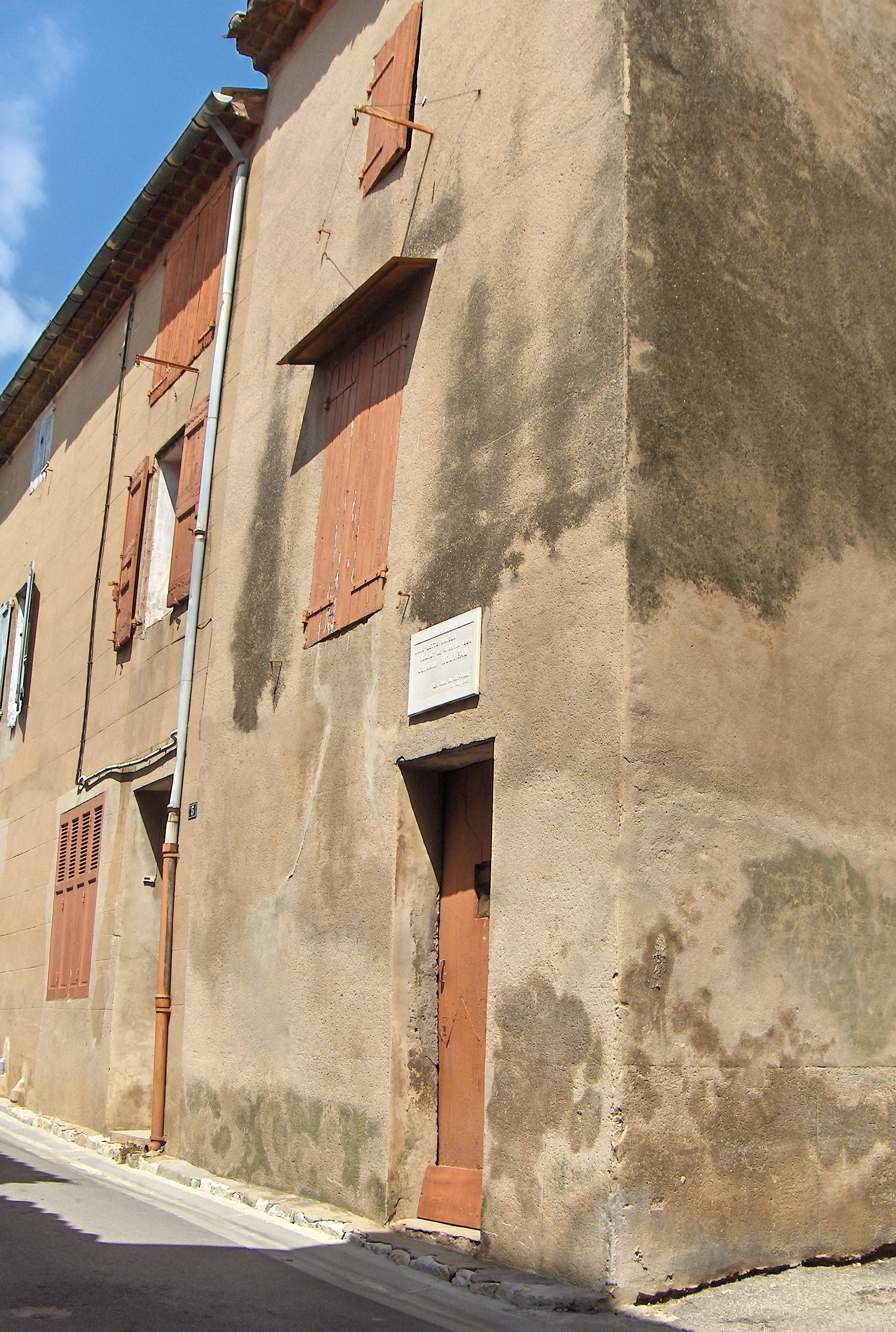
House in Pourrières

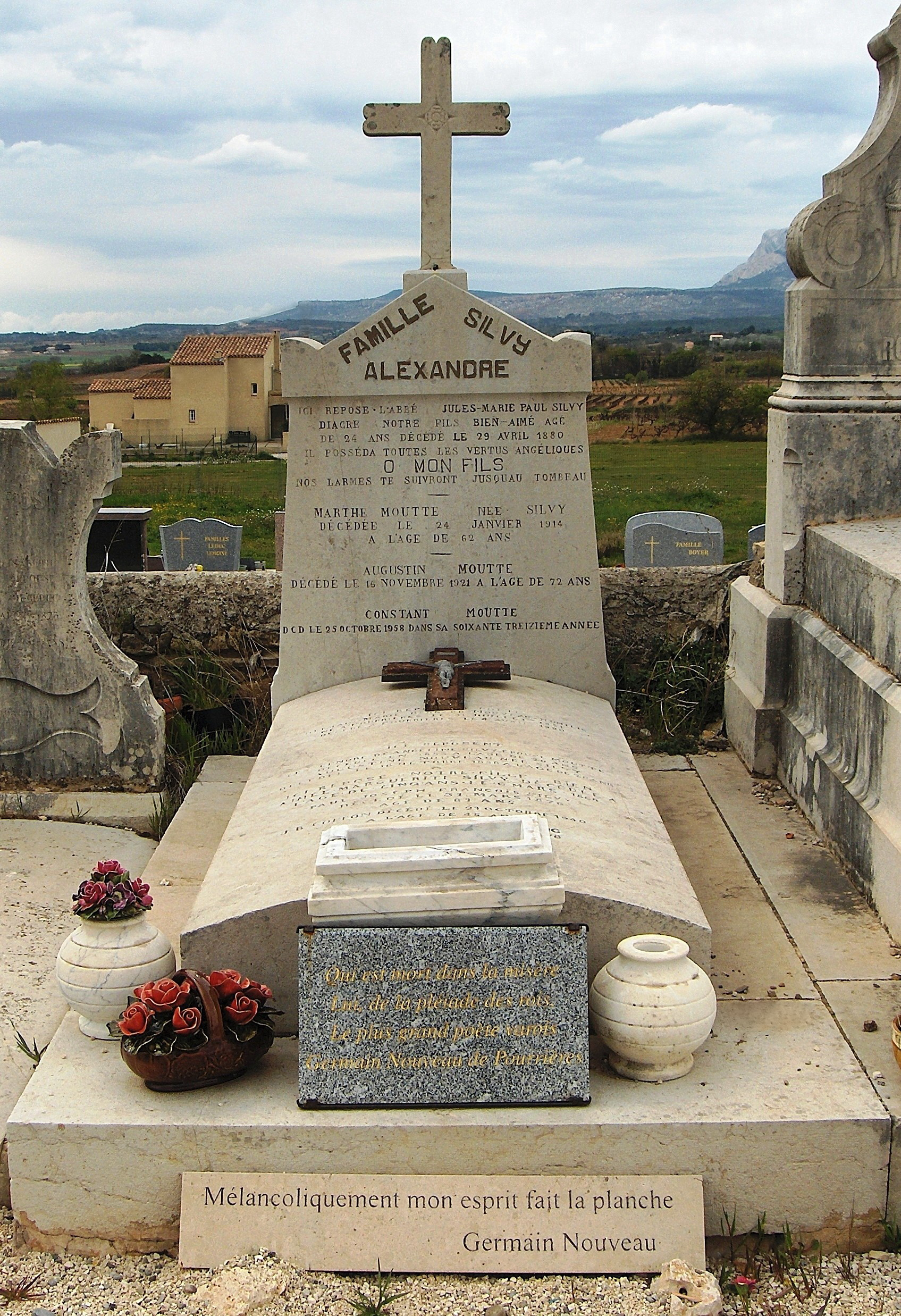
Tomb in Pourrières

== Biography ==
=== Early life ===
Germain Nouveau was born on 31 July 1851 in Pourrières, Var, in France. He was one of four children of Felicien Nouveau (1826–1884) and Marie Silvy (1832–1858). His mother died before he was seven years old, and he was raised by his grandfather. He spent most of his childhood at Aix-en-Provence, and he moved to Paris in the fall of 1872.

=== Early career ===
In Paris in 1872 he published his first poem, "Sonnet of Summer," and he discovered the work of poets Paul Verlaine and the teenage prodigy Arthur Rimbaud. At the end of 1873, he met Rimbaud in person, and together they went to England in March, 1874. He lived with Rimbaud in London at 178 Stamford Street before returning to Paris alone three months later.

=== Mid-career, travel, and mental illness ===
Nouveau travelled to Belgium and the Netherlands, and in 1875 in Brussels he received from Verlaine the manuscript of Rimbaud's Illuminations. He returned to London where he met Verlaine, who became a long-time friend. In 1878, Nouveau contributed to the French periodicals Le Gaulois and Le Figaro under the pseudonym Jean de Noves (one of many noms de plume he used), before travelling to Beirut in 1883. When he returned home, he taught in a lycee in Paris before being struck by a mysterious mental illness in 1891 and spending several months in a mental hospital.

=== Religious conversion and pilgrimage ===
After his mental breakdown, Nouveau voluntarily embarked upon a life of poverty, modelling himself after Saint Benoît-Joseph Labre. He travelled to Rome and made a pilgrimage to Santiago de Compostela before returning to the village of his birth in 1911, where he died in 1920.

== Legacy ==
Much of Nouveau's work was published and became known after his death. Several posthumous poems and other works are collected in the Pléiade edition (Oeuvres Complètes. Pierre-Olivier Walzer (ed.) Paris: Gallimard, 1970). He had a substantial influence on the Surrealists, and critics such as Louis Aragon have called him "not a minor poet but a great poet...equal to Rimbaud."

The rue Germain Nouveau in Aix-en-Provence, Fréjus, Rousset and Saint-Denis are named after him.
