= Ekkehard Grübler =

German scenic designer (1928–2012)

- Born: 29 January 1928; Berlin
- Died: 25 February 2012 (aged 84); Munich
- Occupations: Scenic designer; Costume designer; Academic teacher

Ekkehard Grübler (29 January 1928 – 25 February 2012) was a German scenic designer, costume designer and professor at the Academy of Fine Arts, Munich, from 1977 to 1993. He was the scenic designer for the world premieres of Henze's Il re cervo in 1963 and of Volker David Kirchner's Gilgamesh in 2000.

== Life and career ==
Grübler was born in Berlin on 29 January 1928, the son of Fritz Grübler and his wife Olga née Herden.

Grübler created the stage for Auber's Fra Diavolo at the Bregenzer Festspiele of 1961. He designed stage and costumes for the world premiere of Henze's Il re cervo at the Staatstheater Kassel in 1963, directed by Hans Hartleb and conducted by the composer. He created the scene for Hindemith's Cardillac in its second production at the Nationaltheater München in 1965, directed by Rudolf Hartmann, conducted by Joseph Keilberth, a friend of the composer, and with Dietrich Fischer-Dieskau in the title role. In 1967 he designed stage and costumes for a new production of Mozart's Ascanio in Alba at the Salzburg Festival, directed by Hellmuth Matiasek and conducted by Leopold Hager.

Grübler created the scene for the Austrian premiere of Krenek's Orpheus und Eurydike as part of the Steirischer Herbst festival. The performances at the Graz Opera were directed by Hartleb and conducted by Hector Urbon. He designed the stage for the world premiere of Volker David Kirchner's Gilgamesh, commissioned for the Expo 2000 in Hanover, directed by Hans-Peter Lehmann and conducted by Stefan Sanderling.

Grübler taught scenic design and costume design as professor at the Academy of Fine Arts, Munich from 1977 to 1993. He then became an honorary member of the academy.

Grübler and his wife Brigitte founded a foundation, the Brigitte und Ekkehard Grübler Stiftung, granting scholarships to students of scenic design, in 2015.

Grübler died in Munich on 8 April 1988, at the age of 84. His artistic legacy is kept at the Frankfurt University Library.
