= Peter Cornelius Conservatory =

Music school in Mainz, Germany

Peter-Cornelius-Konservatorium Peter Cornelius Conservatory
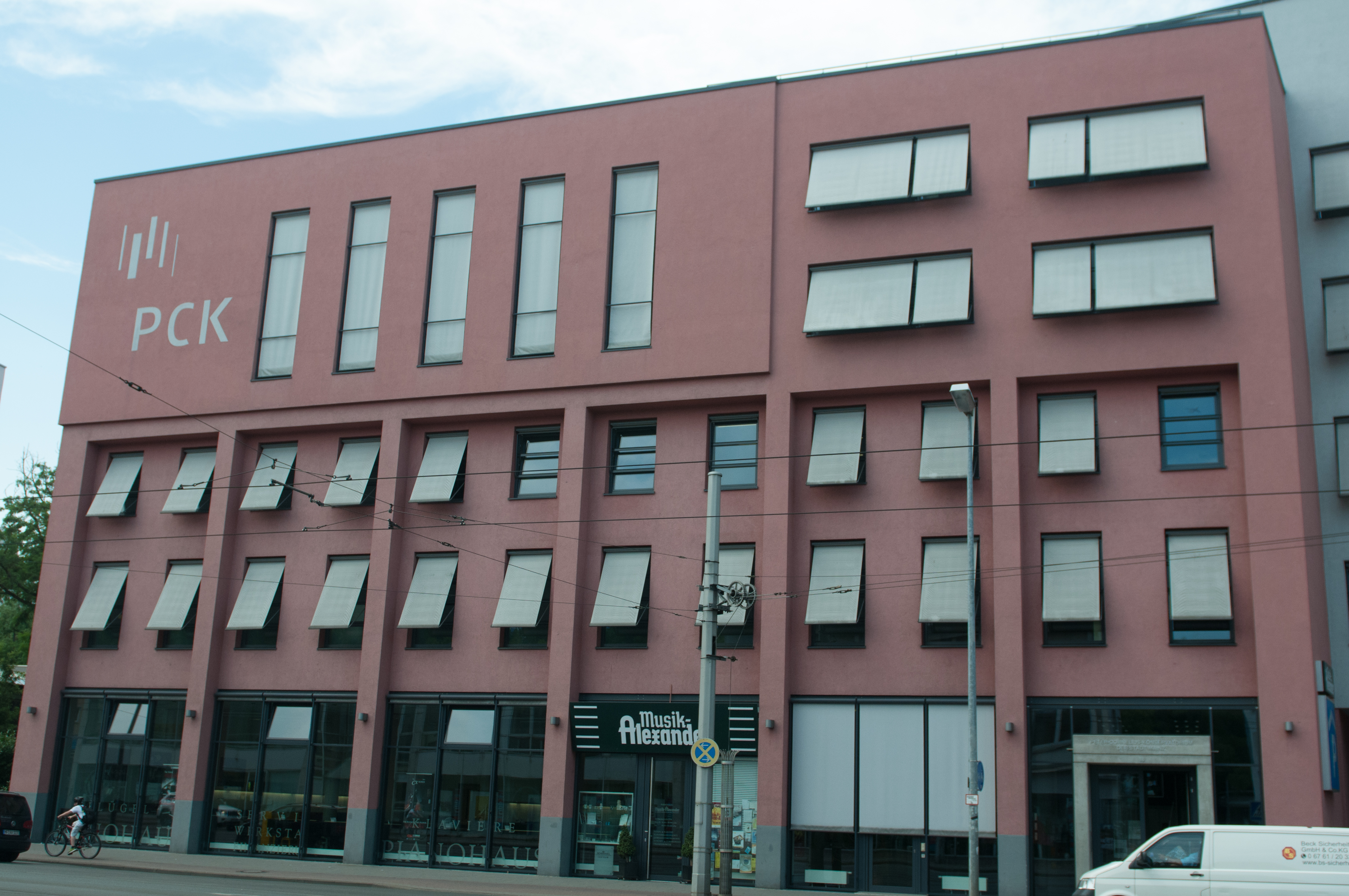
- The conservatory in 2015
- Type: Conservatory
- Established: around 1882
- Founders: Paul Schumacher
- Rector: Gerhard Scholz
- Students: c. 3,000
- Location: Mainz, Rhineland-Palatinate, Germany; 49°59′56.4″N 8°15′25.1″E
- Website: www.pckmainz.de

The Peter Cornelius Conservatory (Peter-Cornelius-Konservatorium der Stadt Mainz, PCK) is the conservatory in Mainz, the capital of the German state Rhineland-Palatinate. It dates back to a first conservatory founded around 1882. It is named after the composer Peter Cornelius who was born in Mainz. It trains both professionals and amateurs, focused of the interplay of both aspects of music-making.

== History ==
The first conservatory in Mainz was established around 1882 and was named after its founder: Paul Schumacher'sches Conservatorium der Musik. The city of Mainz bought the institution and its buildings in 1920, intending to create a municipal university of music (Musikhochschule). The first director was Hans Rosbaud. In 1922, the institution was granted the right to educate and examine music teachers.

In 1936, the Musikhochschule Frankfurt was declared the only Musikhochschule of the region. The Mainz institution was named Peter-Cornelius-Konservatorium.

From 1953, Günter Kehr was the director of the conservatory, from 1966 Volker Hoffmann who expanded elementary music training and also focused on the training of professionals. Gerhard Scholz was director from 1998. A new building was opened in 2008, celebrating 125 years of tradition.

== Program ==
The Musikschule (music school) is the largest in the state, with 140 examined teachers training around 3,500 students from age three months to 80. All instruments of a classical orchestras and voice are taught. The students can meet and perform together in several ensembles and choirs. They also perform at Klassenvorspiel (class recital), concerts and a competition.

The Studienabteilung educates music teachers, in close cooperation with the Hochschule für Musik Mainz. The pedagogical programs are held by the conservatory.

The Junges Ensemble (young ensemble) is an offer to young singers to perform on the stages of the Staatstheater Mainz, in collaboration with the theatre and the university.

== Directors ==
Some of the conservatory directors have become known internationally:

- 1920–1929 Hans Rosbaud
- 1929–1933 Hans Gál
- Lothar Windsperger
- 1953–1961 Günter Kehr
- 1961–1964 Otto Schmidtgen
- 1966– Volker Hoffmann
- Wolfgang Schmidt-Köngernheim
- from 1998 Gerhard Scholz

== Students ==
- Volker David Kirchner (1942–2020), violist and composer
