= Mainzer Domchor =

Boys' and Men's Choir in Mainz (Germany)

Coordinates: 49.998162°N 8.27395°E

- Choir
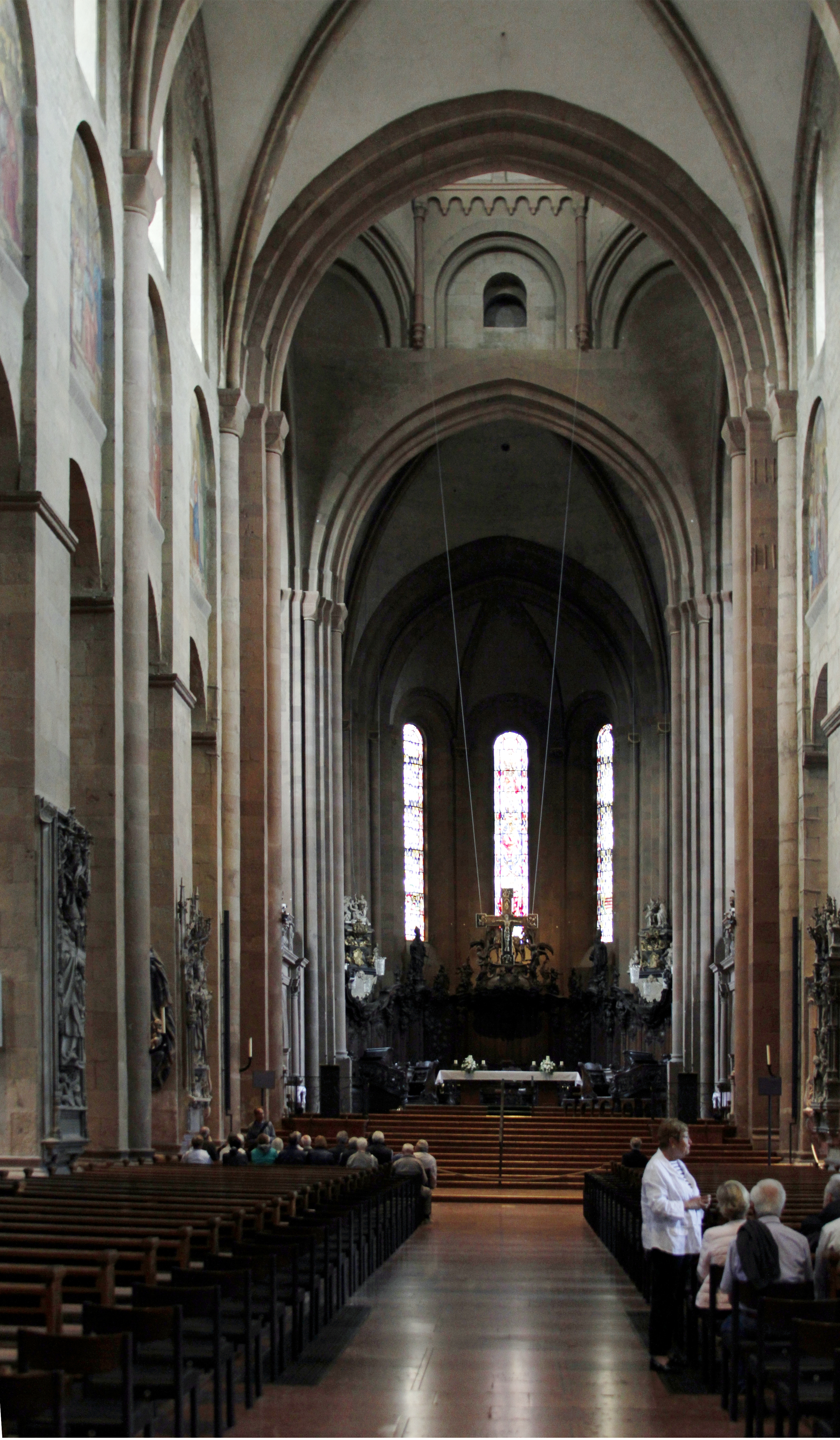
- Nave of the Mainz Cathedral towards the choir
- Origin: Mainz, Germany
- Founded: 1866
- Genre: boys' choir; men's choir
- Members: c. 140 (SATB)
- Chief conductor: Karsten Storck
- Website: http://www.mainzer-domchor.de

The choir Mainzer Domchor is the choir at Mainz Cathedral, of boys' and men's voices. It was founded in 1866 by the then bishop of Mainz, Wilhelm Emmanuel von Ketteler.

== History ==
The choir of c. 140 voices is mainly concerned with the musical part in services at the cathedral. The singers are trained in three weekly rehearsals in the Chorhaus near the cathedral. Every year, a small group of new singers is educated to join the choir. The repertoire consists of church music by Johann Sebastian Bach, Joseph Haydn, Wolfgang Amadeus Mozart, Ludwig van Beethoven, Franz Schubert and Anton Bruckner.

The choir has toured several countries in concert, including Italy, France, Belgium, Switzerland, Israel, Russia, the US, Canada and Brazil. They made several recordings, representing the repertoire.

Heinrich Hain was conductor to 1985, succeeded by Domkapellmeister Mathias Breitschaft to 2012, and then Karsten Storck.

== Literature ==
- Horst-Willi Groß: Der Mainzer Domchor. In: Musica sacra 5 (1975), pp 315–317
- Mathias Breitschaft, Elmar Frey: Mainzer Domchor: 125 Jahre. Schmidt & Bödige, Mainz 1991

== Recordings ==
- Gesänge zum Fest des Hl. Martinus: Hymnus "Fratres unanimes", Antiphon "O beatum pontificem". Choralschola des Mainzer Domchores (conductor: Horst Willi Groß), in: Horst Willi Groß und Heinrich Hain: Choralschola des Mainzer Domchores. Glocken des Mainzer Domes. Seite A, Tonstudio Orgelbau-Vleugels GmbH (= OV 42), Hardheim-Rügental 1976
- Musica Sacra im Hohen Dom zu Mainz. Mainzer Domchor (Conductor: Heinrich Hain), Mainzer Dommusik (conductor: Heino Schneider), Pallas-Verlag, Diepholz
- Wilhelm Petersen: Grosse Messe für 4 Solostimmen, Chor, Orchester und Orgel op. 27, Wergo-Schallplatten, Mainz, 1992
- Lobet den Herren – geistliche Chöre und festliche Klänge, BMG Ariola Hamburg, München, 1999
- Sanctus, BMG Ariola Hamburg, München, 1999
- Carl Orff: Carmina burana, Hr-Media, Frankfurt (Main), 2003
