= Mathias Breitschaft =

German musician

Mathias Breitschaft (born in 1950) is a German church musician and university teacher.

== Biography ==
Breitschaft began his musical career as a member of the boys' choir Regensburger Domspatzen. After his studies of music at the Musikhochschule Frankfurt with Helmuth Rilling and Kurt Hessenberg, he headed the Limburger Domsingknaben from 1973 to 1985. In 1985 he was appointed cathedral conductor at the Mainz Cathedral. In addition to the direction of the Mainzer Domchor, he was the founder of the Cathedral Chorale (Domkantorei) (1987) and the girls' choir of the Mainz Cathedral (1995). He taught as a lecturer and professor for choral conducting at the Musikhochschule Frankfurt. In 1994 he was appointed professor for choral conducting at the Hochschule für Musik Mainz of the Johannes Gutenberg University Mainz. His interpretations have been documented in radio and television recordings. He has performed with his choirs in Europe, Israel, North and South America.

On 22 March 2012, Prelate Heinz Heckwolf announced that Breitschaft would retire at the end of July 2012 and Karsten Storck would become the new cathedral conductor on 1 August 2012. Breitschaft has been working as a voice coach for the traditional choir Kiedricher Chorbuben since autumn 2012.

== Awards ==
Breitschaft received the highest award of the Allgemeiner Cäcilien-Verband für Deutschland, the Orlando-di-Lasso-Medaille on 6 May 2010. On 22 December 2010, Breitschaft received the Gutenberg badge of the state capital Mainz.
