= Ulrich von Wolfenschiessen =

Ulrich von Wolfenschiessen may refer to:

- Ulrich von Wolfenschiessen (fl. 1334–1373), Landammann of Unterwalden and steward of Engelberg Abbey
- Ulrich von Wolfenschiessen (fl. 1398–1402), Landammann of Nidwalden, cousin of Wilhelm von Wolfenschiessen
