= Daniel Hellmann =

Swiss performance artist & activist (born 1985)

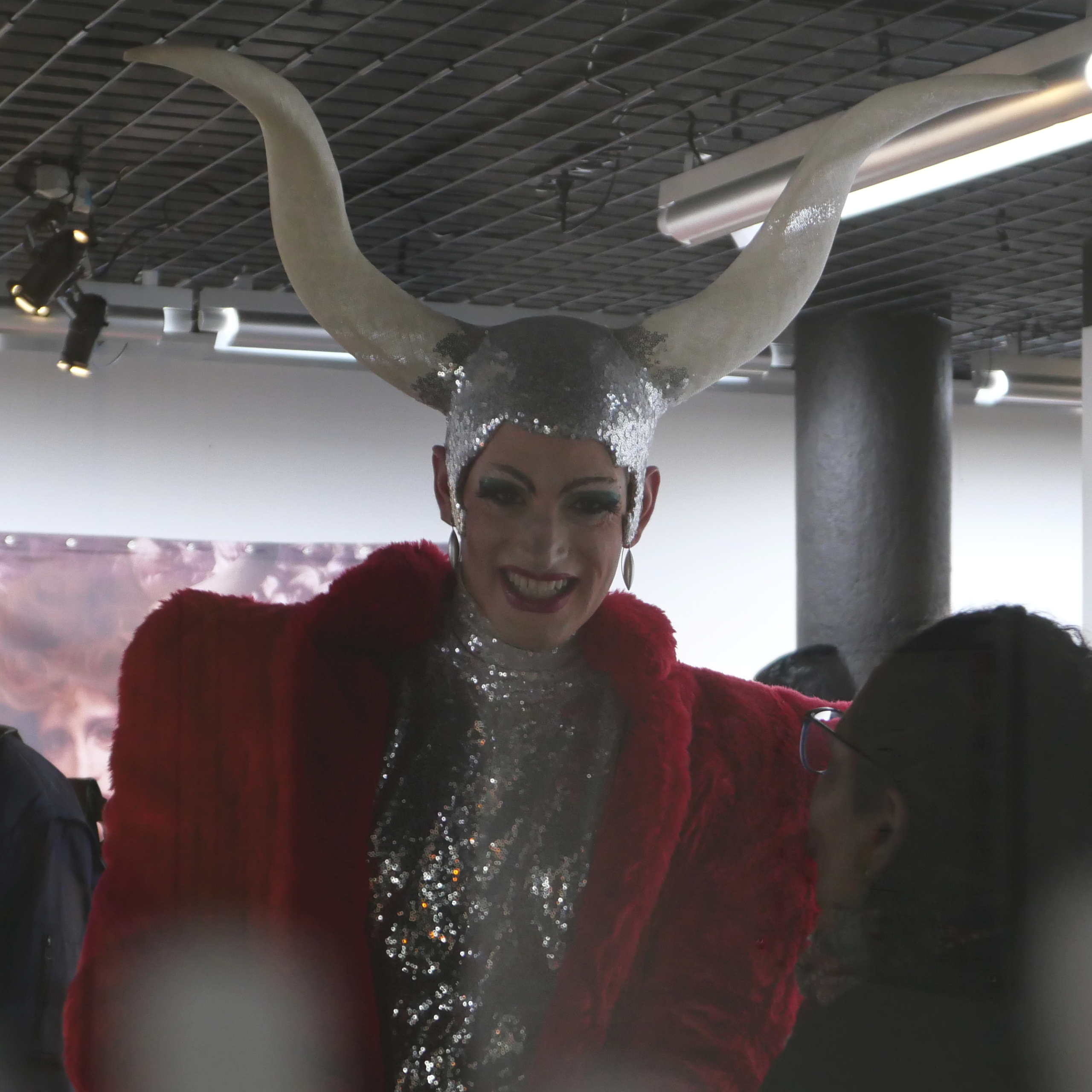
- Soya the Cow aka Hellmann in 2023 at the Antigel Festival in Geneva
- Born: 27 September 1985 (age 41); Zurich

Daniel Hellmann (born 27 September 1985) is a Swiss performance artist. Following a career as an opera singer he has been making headlines since 2012 as a singer, dancer, choreographer and dramatist with his interdisciplinary works which radically question [ocial norms and power structures in the fields of sexuality, human rights, and animal rights.

== Life and career ==
=== Early life and career in classical music ===
Hellmann grew up in the Schwamendingen district of Zurich as the child of a psychotherapist and a lecturer of social pedagogy, who specialised in development psychology. In retrospect he described his liberal Jewish parents as "very open-minded". By his own account, Hellmann used to be «very shy» as a young pupil, but was already writing poems and engaging in the school drama group. Accordingly, he started taking courses in dancing at the age of six years and registered without the knowledge of his parents in the Zurich Boys' Choir, where he for the first time made friends. The daily Neue Züricher Zeitung (NZZ) wrote in a 1997 review that Hellmann sang as a soloist with a «literally elfish voice». In contrast, he has described his time in secondary school as «a nightmare», since he was bullied for his homosexuality and his penchant for glamour. Hellmann has his outing as gay during his late teens.

After Matura Hellmann started studying philosophy at the University of Zurich, but quit after two years and instead started studying classical singing at the Lausanne Conservatory in 2006, supported by a scholarship from the Swiss Study Foundation. For excellent results in his Bachelor's degree as a bass-baritone he received an award from the Juchum foundation in 2008. In 2009, he participated in the Aspen Music Festival. In the following years, he sang in various opera productions in his native Switzerland as well as in Belgium and Germany. In 2011, he earned his Master of Arts (MA) in Lausanne.

=== Career in interdisciplinary arts and as an activist ===
After two decades with a focus on classical music, Hellmann moved away from opera and towards motion theater and dance. He later explained how he felt that the mere interpretation of other people's works was too limiting and that the themes of opera were too far away from his own life and reality. Thus he started taking courses in theater/performance at the University of the Arts Bern in 2010, attending workshops by Brussels-based playing-company Peeping Tom and others. In 2012, he earned another MA in Bern.

Also in 2012 Hellmann co-founded the collective 3art3 Company. Its first project – «K.» – went on stage the same year as a cooperation with Vietnamese choreographer Quan Bui Ngoc. According to media reports, the title was an abbreviation for collective (Kollektiv in German) or camaraderie (Kameradschaft in German). As in an archaic kind of ecstasy, it dealt with group dynamics, violence and love. The debut of the company received the award of recognition from the city of Zurich as well as an award by the association of Swiss writers. In 2014, it was followed by Untold – a piece about untold and suppressed issues – in another cooperation with Ngoc. The daily NZZ praised it in its review as «an almost perfect piece of work». In the same year, Hellmann collaborated with Swiss theater director Ursina Greuel and pianist Samuel Fried to create Nach Lampedusa – Wandererfantasien ("To Lampedusa – Fantasies of a Wanderer"), a music-theatre piece about the situation of asylum seekers in Switzerland.

Since 2014 Hellmann became known to a wider public through his solo-project Full Service. Over the following four years, he realised this interactive performance altogether 55 times in 22 cities, mainly in Switzerland, but also in Belgium, Germany, France, Hong Kong, Japan, the Philippines, Spain, Thailand and the United States. Hellmann offered to by-passers to execute any service to them, at once and on-site in a tent, provided that both sides could agree on the conditions within the applicable legal framework and on the price. He executed altogether 665 services and thus earned the equivalent of €8,776. The project was meant to explore capitalist exchange rates of money and power in interpersonal relationships and to illustrate that there is basically no difference between sex work and other professions. However, in the end he was barely asked for sexual services.

From 2015 on, Hellmann continued to deal with this subject through his character Traumboy ("dream boy"): as a male prostitute he confronted his audiences with the stereotypes surrounding sex work to demystify the issue and to thus fight against the social stigma associated with that profession. The solo performance, which was a mix of fiction and documentation, was selected to be part of the Swiss contribution to the Festival d'Avignon and the Edinburgh Festival Fringe.

While speaking out clearly against forced prostitution, Hellmann strongly argued against the quasi-automatic equation of sex work and human trafficking by asking: «Is it that the sex is dirty or isn't it rather that the money is dirty?» Moreover, he emphasized that

«For people, who are less privileged than I am, sex work may be a way to live a self-determined life. If you have a problem with that, you should work to get rid of poverty and discrimination around the world, but not to abolish prostitution.»

Since society usually accords self-determination to men rather than to women when it comes to prostitution as well, Hellmann produced the female equivalent Traumgirl with the German-Polish Actor Anne Welenc (born 1987) which premiered in 2019 at the Edinburgh Festival Fringe. From 2018 until 2020, Hellmann also curated the performing arts section of la Fête du Slip, an interdisciplinary gender and sexualities festival in Lausanne.

As the exploitation of animal bodies is generally accepted, Hellmann has increasingly focused on this issue since 2016. During research for the production of Requiem for a piece of meat he read the book Artgerecht ist nur die Freiheit ("Only freedom is species-appropriate") by Turco-German writer Hilal Sezgin and became vegan. The performance, which combined historical church music and contemporary dance, was awarded the June Johnson Dance Prize, but got rejected by some theatres and – according to Hellmann – «even censored by a few».

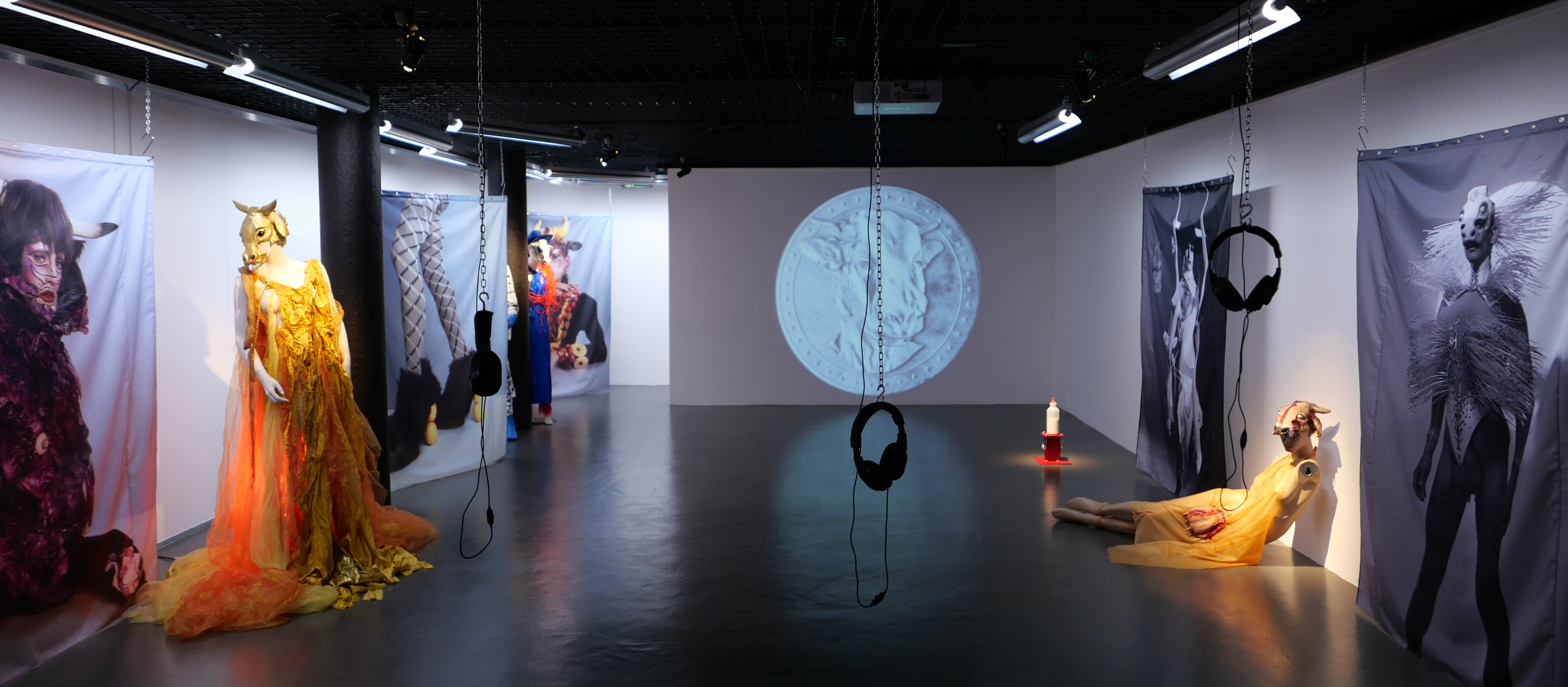
Planet Moo at the Théâtre Saint-Gervais in Geneva during the 2023 Antigel Festival

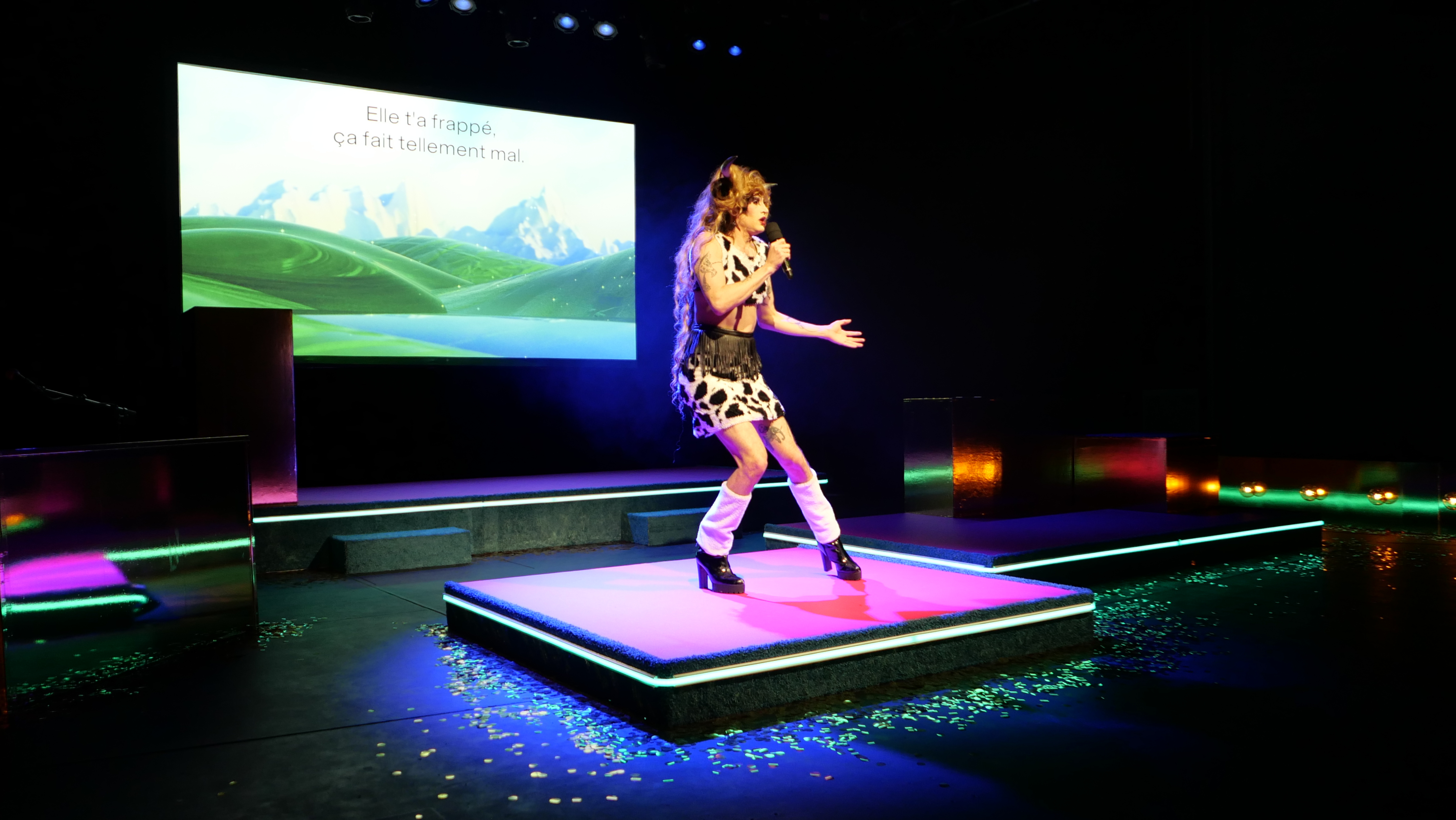
Soya the Cow in "Dear Human Animals" at the Théâtre Saint-Gervais

During a 2017 artist residency in San Francisco Hellmann was by his own account inspired by the local culture of drag queens and drag kings as well as by the animal rights organisation Direct Action Everywhere to create the sex-positive feminist and vegan drag-cow Soya the Cow as his alter ego. He subsequently created the solo shows Dear Human Animals and Try walking in my Hooves, the music album Purple Grass and the exhibition Planet Moo.

To raise attention for the issues of animal rights and climate justice to a wider audience beyond the art festivals Hellmann also sought appearances in mainstream media. For instance, in 2020 he went on the panel of Der Club, a weekly talk show by German-language Swiss television channel SRF1, to discuss the subject «Terror auf dem Teller» ("Terror on the plate"). And in 2021, he sang his version of the a-ha's hit Take On Me on German TV at the talent show The Voice of Germany. Faced with criticism from the animal rights movement that he culturally appropriated the identity of a cow Hellmann moved from Berlin to the animal sanctuary Hof Narr in Egg near Zurich during a lockdown of the COVID-19 pandemic to live for several months with retired livestock.
