= Johann von Wolfenschiessen =

Ammann in Nidwalden (14th century)

- Title: Ammann
- Father: Walter von Wolfenschiessen

Johann von Wolfenschiessen (first mentioned 1309; last mentioned 1329) was a member of the Wolfenschiessen family. Like his father Walter, he called himself Ammann from 1327, and in 1328 he held the Widemgüter (glebe lands) of Engelberg Abbey as a fief.

== Biography ==
Johann von Wolfenschiessen was the son of Walter. He was the father of Ulrich.

In 1325 and 1329 Johann was a witness in financial matters. From 1327, like his father, he called himself Ammann. In the same year he acted as arbitrator in a dispute between Altzellen and Bergschwand. In 1328 he held the glebe lands of Engelberg Abbey as a fief.

== Bibliography ==
- K. von Deschwanden, "Urkundliches Verzeichniss der Landammänner, Vorgesetzten und Amtsleute des Landes Unterwalden nid dem Wald", in Der Geschichtsfreund, 26, 1871, 13–15
