= Studienstiftung des deutschen Volkes =

German organisation sponsoring students

Studienstiftung
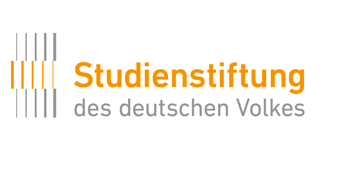

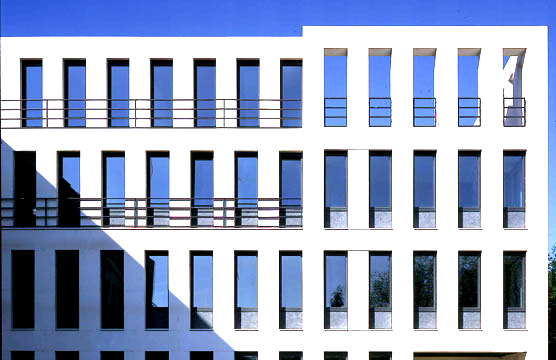
- German Academic Scholarship Foundation, Headquarters, Bonn

Scholarship foundation overview
- Formed: 1925
- Jurisdiction: Germany
- Headquarters: Bonn
- Annual budget: €126 million (2023)
- Scholarship foundation executives: Michael Hoch, President; Annette Julius, Secretary General
- Website: studienstiftung.de

The German Academic Scholarship Foundation (German: Studienstiftung des deutschen Volkes, or Studienstiftung for short) is Germany's largest and most prestigious scholarship foundation. According to its statutes, it supports "the university education of young people who, on account of their exceptional academic or artistic talents and their personalities, can be expected to make an outstanding contribution to society as a whole". The Studienstiftung is non-political, non-denominational and ideologically independent. Its headquarters are located in Bonn; it also has an office in Berlin. The current president is University of Bonn director Michael Hoch, and its patron (Schirmherr) is the President of Germany, Frank-Walter Steinmeier.

The Studienstiftung, like 12 other scholarship foundations (Begabtenförderungswerk), is funded by the German Federal Ministry of Research, Technology and Space, with funds from the federal government, the German federal states and local authorities, numerous foundations and businesses as well as numerous private donors. In 2025, the Studienstiftung's budget was around €137 million. Between 1925 and 2026, it has supported over 100,000 students and doctoral candidates; as of 2026, it had over 90,000 alumni worldwide.

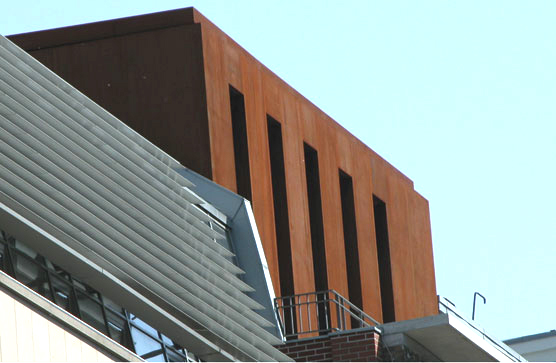
German Academic Scholarship Foundation, branch office, Berlin

The selection process is extremely rigorous and only those students who show outstanding academic and personal promise are chosen. The Studienstiftung awards scholarships to ca. 0.51% of German students. Since April 2017, Federal President Frank-Walter Steinmeier has been the patron of the German Academic Scholarship Foundation, thereby continuing the tradition of the Federal Presidents that began with Richard von Weizsäcker in 1984. Following its example, the Swiss Study Foundation (Schweizerische Studienstiftung) was established in 1991.

== History ==
Initially founded in Dresden in 1925 as a department of the Deutsche Studentenschaft, an amalgamation of German student committees, the Studienstiftung des deutschen Volkes was dissolved in 1934 under National Socialism and replaced by the "Reichsförderung", a department of the newly founded Reichsstudentenwerk. The Studienstiftung des deutschen Volkes was newly formed as a registered association in Cologne in 1948.

Chairs of the Executive Board (since 1980 also serving as Presidents) of the Studienstiftung
President	In office
Peter van Aubel	1948–1959
Theodor Pfizer	1959-1979
Werner Maihofer	1980–1982
Manfred Eigen	1982–1993
Helmut Altner	1993–2003
Gerhard Roth	2003–2011
Reinhard Zimmermann	2011–2023
Michael Hoch	2023–

Secretaries General of the Studienstiftung
Secretary General	In office
Heinz Haerten	1948–1970
Hartmut Rahn	1970–1995
Gerhard Teufel	1995-2012
Annette Julius	2012–

== Admission ==
The Studienstiftung offers a general scholarship for bachelor's and master's studies that consists of both financial and academic support. Eligibility is based on the criteria for BAFöG, the German state support system for students. The Studienstiftung scholarship accepts only applicants that study full time at university. A part of an applicant's university studies must be at a university in Germany, in another EU country, or in Switzerland. German or EU citizenship are not required, and there are no age criteria.

The Studienstiftung accepts exceptionally talented students and doctoral candidates selected in accordance with its mission statement, which is based upon the principles of "excellence, initiative and responsibility". Scholarship holders (scholars) are admitted through various channels:

1. Nomination by a school: The principal of a high school or school with an upper secondary level can nominate one in 30 senior students for admission to the Studienstiftung. This student must excel both academically and in terms of social commitment. Since 2026, the school administration may additionally nominate a suitable person from the cohort in the year before the Abitur examinations. Nominated students attend a three-day selection seminar where their eligibility for funding is assessed in individual interviews and group discussions. 28.2% of students nominated in 2025 were offered admission to the Studienstiftung.
2. Nomination by professors: Students at universities and universities of applied science can be nominated directly by university teachers. Again, candidates attend a selection seminar. In 2025, 43.9% of students nominated by their professors were offered admission to the Studienstiftung.
3. Nomination by an examination board: Just as students can be nominated by schools, one in every 50 students in the second academic year in his/her respective study programme can be nominated by universities and universities of applied science. The nomination must be supported by a professor. The selection seminar is organised along the same lines as the selection seminar for students nominated by schools. In this case, however, the candidate's proven academic achievements at university also carry weight. In 2025, 21.9% of nominees were offered admission.
4. Assessment Test: Since February 2010, candidates can also put themselves forward for a scholarship. First and second-semester students can sign up for the Studienstiftung assessment test in January/February/March each year. The test is held at test centres throughout Germany. The applicants with the best results are invited to attend the selection seminar. While the assessment test determines applicants' cognitive abilities, the selection seminar focuses on motivation, extracurricular interests, social commitment and social skills, which are assessed in personal interviews and group discussions.
5. Nomination by alums: Studienstiftung alums may also nominate students who they consider appropriate, having taught them personally in school or university courses.
6. Winners of a national or federal competition or nomination by select cooperation partners: Winners of or participants in various competitions on a national, federal or international level (e.g. Bundeswettbewerb Informatik, Bundeswettbewerb Mathematik, Bundeswettbewerb Fremdsprachen, Jugend forscht, Jugend debattiert, Internationale Mathematik-Olympiade, Internationale Physik-Olympiade, Altsprachenwettbewerb des Landes Baden-Württemberg) may be offered admission to the Studienstiftung. Select cooperation partners (e.g. START-Stiftung) may also nominate potential sponsorship candidates.
7. Support of musicians and artists: After an internal pre-selection procedure, universities can nominate students of the fine arts, music and the performing arts for participation in a Studienstiftung selection seminar.
8. Doctoral funding: Academically outstanding and socially engaged doctoral researchers can apply for funding for their doctoral project together with their supervisors. Requirements include a degree completed with results far above average, broad interests, and a scientifically highly demanding and innovative doctoral research project.

Selection from among the nominations and applications takes place during a multi-day selection seminar conducted by a committee. On average, around 25% of those nominated are ultimately admitted to the German Academic Scholarship Foundation's merit-based support programme. The selection committee bases its decision on five criteria, which are assessed through individual interviews, presentations, and discussion sessions:

- Intellectual abilities
- Commitment to achievement and motivation
- Communication and articulation skills
- Social Competence
- Social engagement and a broad range of interests

If admission occurs before the end of the fourth semester, sponsorship is usually granted until the end of the sixth semester. An extension of the scholarship beyond the sixth semester usually depends on academic performance in the first four semesters (students need to be in the top 10% to 15% of their class). In borderline cases, aspects other than academic achievements – such as exceptional social engagement or particular personal circumstances – may positively influence the decision to approve further funding. After an application has been approved, funding is awarded from the 6th semester until studies are completed (for example, until the master's degree or state examinations have been completed). In 2025, 95% of requests for further funding were approved.

== Funding ==
The German Academic Scholarship Foundation is primarily funded through public resources. The Federal Ministry of Research, Technology and Space (Ministerium für Forschung, Technoloie und Raumfahrt) is the largest contributor, accounting for around 91% of the total budget. In addition, the budget is composed as follows (as of 2025):

- 4% from grants provided by federal states and municipalities
- 1% from the Federal Ministry of Economic Affairs and Engerie (Bundesministerium für Wirtschaft und Engerie
- 2% from cooperation pgrammes, foundations, and companies
- 5% from the Bavarian State Ministry of Science and the Arts (for the implementation of the Max Weber Programme)
- 3% from private donations, contributions from corporate partners, participants' own contributions, and reimbursements for programmes and events

== Scholarships ==
=== General scholarship for undergraduate, graduate and PhD students ===
The general Studienstiftung scholarship consists of both financial and academic support.

==== Financial support ====
Financial support includes an allowance (€300 monthly) and subsidies for health and long-term care insurance. Scholars can receive a need-based basic scholarship, which is calculated according to the BAföG (Federal Training Assistance Act) and can be up to €855 per month. Additional funds are provided for students with children.

PhD scholars receive a monthly award of €1,650 plus a research allowance of €100. Additional funds are provided for PhD students with children. Financial support is regulated by the guidelines of the German Ministry of Research, Technology and Space (BMFTR). Visits abroad are also supported by grants or overseas allowances and the partial payment of tuition fees. Under the terms of No. 11 Einkommensteuergesetz (EStG – German Income Tax Law) scholarship payments are tax-free.

==== Academic support ====
The Studienstiftung's academic support includes summer schools, research groups, language courses, workshops and mentoring by liaison professors, academics who carry out this task for the Studienstiftung on a voluntary basis. Scholars are required to submit a report on their studies and other activities every semester during the first semesters (usually until the end of the fourth semester), and once a year thereafter. Scholars can also apply for funding in order to organise their own conferences and other events.

The Studienstiftung offers yearly two-week subsidised summer academies, which are its "central event format" for scholarship holders. Scholars themselves can also organise shorter academies and benefit from similar subsidisation. For instance, queer scholarship holders have been making use of this possibility to organise annual meetings since 2001, with financial support from the Studienstiftung since the 2014 edition.

=== Internal scholarship programmes ===
In addition to its regular scholarship scheme, the Studienstiftung offers internal scholarship programmes for selected scholars and alumni. Examples include the KAUST-Studienstiftung programme, a joint partnership between the Saudi Arabian King Abdullah University of Science and Technology (KAUST) and the Studienstiftung under the patronage of the German Federal Foreign Office which allows scholars from the STEM disciplines to join KAUST for research internships or to enrol in Master or PhD programs. In the musical field, for example, in cooperation with the Beethoven House residence scholarships are awarded for young composers.

=== Open scholarship programmes ===
Moreover, the Studienstiftung offers open scholarship programmes, which are run and financed in cooperation with other organisations. They include the McCloy Academic Scholarship Program, the ERP-Stipendienprogramm and the Carlo-Schmid-Programm. Participation in these scholarship programmes does not require previously holding a regular scholarship by the Studienstiftung.

Since 2005 the Studienstiftung has also been running the Max Weber scholarship for students in Bavaria, introduced by the regional (Land) administration via the Bavarian Elite Support Act (BayEFG).

== Statistics ==
- In 2025, 71.8% of scholarship holders received only a study allowance of €300, 16.8% received partial funding, and 11.4% received a full scholarship.
- In 2025, around 90% of the German Academic Scholarship Foundation's funding came from public resources, with the largest share provided by the Federal Ministry of Research, Technology and Space.
- In recent years, the Foundation has increased the proportion of students from non-academic family backgrounds and students with a migration background: in 2025, 26.9% of scholarship holders came from non-academic family backgrounds, and 22.2% had a migration background.
- The proportion of women among recipients of undergraduate funding was 55.1% in 2025, while the proportion of women receiving doctoral funding was 51.4%.

Year	Studienstiftung scholars^{:109}			Number of students in Germany	Studienstiftung scholars as a share of students* (Note: The percentages would be lower if one only counted the scholars studying at universities in Germany.)
Year	Undergraduate and graduate	Doctoral	Total	Number of students in Germany	Studienstiftung scholars as a share of students*
2005	6,966	993	7,959	1,985,765	0.40 %
2006	7,352	946	8,298	1,979,043	0.42 %
2007	8,438	1,080	9,518	1,941,405	0.49 %
2008	10,030	1,194	11,224	2,025,307	0.55 %
2009	11,482	1,211	12,693	2,121,178	0.60 %
2010	11,336	1,303	12,639	2,217,294	0.57 %
2011	11,123	1,350	12,473	2,380,974	0.52 %
2012	11,373	1,274	12,647	2,499,409	0.51 %
2013	11,195	1,273	12,468	2,616,881	0.48 %
2014	11,858	1,184	13,042	2,698,910	0.48 %
2015	12,158	1,141	13,299	2,757,799	0.48 %
2016	12,879	1,156	14,035	2,807,010	0.50 %
2017	12,749	1,202	13,951	2,844,978	0.49 %
2018	12,752	1,270	14,022	2,868,222	0.49 %
2019	12,953	1,321	14,274	2,891,049	0.49 %
2020	13,402	1,393	14,795	2,944,145	0.46 %
2021	14,241	1,426	15,667	2,941,915	0.48 %
2022	13,902	1,359	15,261	2,920,263	0.48 %
2023	13,626	1,262	14,888	2,869,500	0.48 %
2024	13,305	1,225	14,530	2,868,311	0.51 %
2025	13,126	1,310	14,436	2,876,938	0.51 %

* The statistics do not include doctoral researchers who are not enrolled at a university; however, these individuals are included in the figures reported by the German Academic Scholarship Foundation (in 2024: around 70,000 doctoral researchers).

German universities where over 1% of students are Studienstiftung scholars (2025)
University (Note: Universities with more than 5 Studienstiftung scholars)	Students in the 2024/25 winter semester	Studienstiftung scholars	Studienstiftung scholars as a share of students
Public Universities			
Heidelberg University	30,603	682	2.23%
Hannover Medical School	3,982	79	1.98%
Charité Berlin	9,961	150	1.51%
University of Freiburg	24,133	316	1.31%
University of Lübeck	6,069	69	1.14%
University of Münster	41,962	427	1.02%
Private Universities			
Bucerius Law School	688	61	8.87%
University for the Design of Society Bernkastel-Kues	141	5	3.55%
Hertie School Berlin	751	15	2.00%
Zeppelin University Fridrichshaven	506	6	1.19%

== Notable alums ==
=== Natural sciences ===
- Martin Beneke, physicist, Leibniz Prize 2008
- Manfred Eigen, Nobel Prize chemistry 1962, president of the Studienstiftung 1982–1993
- Gerd Faltings, mathematician, Fields Medal 1986
- Reinhard Genzel, Nobel Prize physics 2020
- Magdalena Götz, biologist, Leibniz Prize 2007
- Robert Huber, Nobel Prize chemistry 1988
- Joachim Frank, Nobel Prize chemistry 2017
- J. Hans D. Jensen, Nobel Prize physics 1963
- Wolfgang Ketterle, Nobel Prize physics 2001
- Christian Keysers, neuroscientist
- Wolfgang Lück, mathematician, Leibniz Prize 2008
- Jochen Mannhart, physicist, Leibniz Prize 2008
- Erwin Neher, Nobel Prize medicine 1991
- Felix Otto, mathematician, Leibniz Prize 2006
- Peter Scholze, mathematician, Fields Medal 2018
- Bernhard Schölkopf, computer scientist, Leibniz Prize 2018
- Detlef Weigel, biologist, Leibniz Prize 2007

=== Social sciences ===
- Ulrich Beck, sociologist
- Dirk Kaesler, sociologist
- Ulrike Malmendier, economist
- Ulrike Müßig, legal historian
- Stephan Reimertz, art historian
- Ernst-Ludwig von Thadden, economist
- Michèle Tertilt, economist, Leibniz Prize 2019
- Reinhard Zimmermann, legal historian, Leibniz Prize 1996 (Studienstiftung president 2011–)

=== Business and NGOs ===
- Andreas von Bechtolsheim, co-founder Sun Microsystems
- Wolfgang Bernhard, member of the board of management of Daimler AG
- Alexander Dibelius, managing director, Germany, Goldman Sachs
- Frank Mattern, head of the German Office, McKinsey and Company
- Hans-Paul Bürkner, senior partner and global chair emeritus of the Boston Consulting Group

=== Politics and civil service ===
- Fritz Kuhn, politician, co-chairman of Bündnis 90/Die Grünen, the German Green Party, from June 2000 to December 2002
- Andreas Paulus, judge at the Federal Constitutional Court of Germany
- Frauke Petry, politician and former chair of the Alternative for Germany
- Karl Schiller, politician and scientist, former Federal Minister of Finance of Germany
- Gesine Schwan, professor, SPD-candidate for the office of the federal president, 2004
- Steffen Seibert, journalist, former government spokesman and head of the Press and Information Office of Germany
- Robert Tillmanns, politician, former Federal Minister of Germany
- Christine Teusch, politician, Minister of Education of North Rhine-Westphalia from 1947 to 1954, and as such the first female Minister in Germany
- Antje Vollmer, politician, until 2005 vice-president of the German parliament

=== Arts ===
- Mechthild Bach, soprano
- Hans-Jürgen von Bose, professor, composer
- Hans Breder, professor, artist
- Christa Dichgans, writer
- Moritz Eggert, composer, pianist
- Hans Magnus Enzensberger, writer
- Justus Frantz, pianist
- Anna Gourari, pianist
- Horst Janssen, artist
- Bas Kast, writer
- Heinz Rudolf Kunze, singer and composer
- Michael Kunze, librettist and translator
- Igor Levit, pianist
- Frei Otto, architect
- Matthias Pintscher, composer
- Philipp Tingler, writer, journalist and economist
- Juli Zeh, writer

=== Journalism ===
- Petra Gerster, journalist
- Claus Kleber, journalist, anchor of the "heute-journal"
- Ulrike Meinhof, editor, subsequently member of the Red Army Faction (RAF)
- Frank Schirrmacher, journalist

== See also ==
- Swiss Study Foundation (Schweizerische Studienstiftung)
- National Merit Scholarship Program in the United States
