= Arnold von Wolfenschiessen =

Politician from Nidwalden (died 1439)

- Died: 1439
- Father: Wilhelm von Wolfenschiessen

Arnold von Wolfenschiessen (first mentioned 1410; died 1439) was an envoy to the Federal Diet (Tagsatzung), mentioned 38 times in that role between 1416 and 1437. In 1417 he obtained high justice (Blutgerichtsbarkeit) for Nidwalden from Sigismund. With him the Wolfenschiessen family reached its economic, social, and political peak.

== Biography ==
Arnold von Wolfenschiessen was the son of Wilhelm. Under his son Heinrich a gradual decline of the family began.

Arnold lived in Stans. In 1413 he and others tried to enlarge Nidwalden in the Engelberg valley at the expense of Engelberg Abbey. Subsequently he was excommunicated for mistreating a cleric. In 1417 he obtained from Sigismund the grant of high justice for Nidwalden. As Nidwalden's representative at peace negotiations in 1426, he obtained payments of money and exemptions from customs duties from Milan. Between 1416 and 1437 he is mentioned 38 times as an envoy to the Federal Diet. He was an important lender and the founder of a benefice in Stans.

== Bibliography ==
- D. Rogger, Obwaldner Landwirtschaft im Spätmittelalter, 1989, 125–136
