= Muessig =

Muessig, Müssig or Müßig is a German surname. Notable people with the surname include:

- Carolyn Muessig, historian of religion
- Ulrike Müßig (born 1968), German jurist and legal historian
