= Walter von Wolfenschiessen =

Ammann of Engelberg Abbey (13th century)

- Title: Ammann of Engelberg Abbey
- Father: Berchtold

Walter von Wolfenschiessen (first mentioned 1267; last mentioned 1280) was Ammann of Engelberg Abbey. In 1277 he was one of the founders of the church in Wolfenschiessen.

== Biography ==
Walter von Wolfenschiessen was a member of the Wolfenschiessen family and the son of Berchtold, an Ammann. He was the father of Johann von Wolfenschiessen.

Walter is documented in 1275 as Ammann of Engelberg Abbey, and in 1277 he was also referred to as minister dictus de Wolfenschiessen ("minister called of Wolfenschiessen"). In 1277 he was one of the founders of the church in Wolfenschiessen. With his brother Konrad he appeared several times as a witness in matters concerning Engelberg Abbey.

== Bibliography ==
- K. von Deschwanden, "Urkundliches Verzeichniss der Landammänner, Vorgesetzten und Amtsleute des Landes Unterwalden nid dem Wald", in Der Geschichtsfreund, 26, 1871, 12–13
- T. Graf, "Die Ritter von Wolfenschiessen", in Beiträge zur Geschichte Nidwaldens, 28, 1963, 30–41
