= Wolfenschiessen family =

Family in Nidwalden, Switzerland

The Wolfenschiessen family (in German von Wolfenschiessen) was an influential family in Nidwalden of unknown, probably peasant origin. From the end of the 13th century its two main lines bore the bynames Amstein and Ammann von Wolfenschiessen. The family reached its economic, social, and political peak with Arnold, who is mentioned from 1410. The Ammann line died out at the beginning of the 17th century, and all the Amstein lines died out in the 15th and 16th centuries.

== History ==
From the end of the 13th century the two main lines of the family bore the bynames Amstein and Ammann von Wolfenschiessen. In the 13th century, members of the family held knightly fiefs from the monasteries of Murbach-Lucerne and Engelberg and from the counts of Frohburg, in whose circle of lesser-noble witnesses they often moved, without, however, being explicitly described as knights. After the middle of the 13th century, the family is documented in charters in the persons of Eglolf and his sons Berchtold, Heinrich, Burkard, Arnold, and Eglolf. Between 1267 and 1280, Berchtold's sons Walter and Konrad often appear in matters concerning Engelberg Abbey, and from 1275 Walter is referred to as minister (in German Ammann). Walter's son Johann also called himself Ammann von Wolfenschiessen, as did Johann's son Ulrich, who is mentioned from 1334 into the 1370s, held the office of Landammann (chief magistrate) several times, and in 1357 explicitly described himself as Amtmann (steward) of Engelberg Abbey. In the 15th century, however, the Ammann line lost its social position and became impoverished, and thereafter it hardly appears in public office. It died out at the beginning of the 17th century.

The Heinrich mentioned above is considered the first of the Amstein line. His son Werner settled in the Hasli valley in the early 14th century, and his other son Konrad attained a certain influence in the Urseren valley. The Amstein line then does not appear in the records for several decades, so the cousins Wilhelm and Ulrich, who repeatedly held the office of Landammann of Nidwalden, cannot be placed in the genealogy. In the 14th century, members of this line relied on the cattle trade, fishing, and credit transactions. Early on, they gained a foothold in the Bernese Oberland through landholdings. They owed their rapid social rise into the rural elite to the fall of the lords of Hunwil and their followers in 1382, and they subsequently took the place of the Hunwil, both in political position and in lucrative landholdings. By the end of the 14th century, the members of the Amstein line had settled in Stans. With Wilhelm's son Arnold, mentioned from 1410, the family reached its economic, social, and political peak. Under his son Heinrich, a gradual decline began. All the Amstein lines, including those in Buochs and Ennetbürgen and in Alpnach (Johann Amstein), died out in the 15th and 16th centuries.

== Bibliography ==
- R. Durrer, Die Einheit Unterwaldens, 1910, 89–91
- T. Graf, "Die Ritter von Wolfenschiessen", in Beiträge zur Geschichte Nidwaldens, 28, 1963, 30–41
- Die Kunstdenkmäler der Schweiz, Unterwalden, 2nd ed., 1971, 688–690, 1056–1061
- D. Rogger, Obwaldner Landwirtschaft im Spätmittelalter, 1989, 125–136
- R. Sablonier, "Innerschweizer Gesellschaft im 14. Jahrhundert", in Innerschweiz und frühe Eidgenossenschaft, 2, 1990, 9–233, especially 31, 34–36, 38, 52, 54, 159, 162, 199, 221
