= Academia Engelberg Foundation =

Swiss foundation

Logo of the Academia Engelberg Foundation

The Academia Engelberg Foundation is a Swiss foundation in Engelberg in the Canton of Obwalden that aims to impart and utilize knowledge. It promotes the dialogue on the scientific, technological and ecological basic values of society.

== Founding and Donors ==
The Foundation was established on September 27, 2001 and is based in the Engelberg monastery. The Foundation's founding members are the Cantons of Uri, Schwyz, Obwalden, Nidwalden, Lucerne, and Zug, the town of Engelberg and the Swiss Reinsurance Company (Swiss Re). The Foundation is subject to federal oversight.

== Purpose ==
The Foundation organizes or supports inter-disciplinary events such as the annual conference, follow-up events and projects with an international flair. The Academia Engelberg Foundation funds the events with contributions from the public sector (federal, cantonal and municipal governments), the business community, foundations and via the Friends of Academia Engelberg. It is not a donation-based foundation, is non-profit, and tax-exempt. Its activities are inter-disciplinary and bring together participants from different countries, cultures and religions. Particular emphasis is placed on the interaction between generations and between genders.

== Annual Conferences ==
Every year, a multi-day congress on a subject from the natural and technical sciences and the humanities is organized in Engelberg. Personalities from science, business, politics and society as well as students are invited. The «Dialogue on Science» is not only designed to spark thematic discussions but also to propose solutions. In preparation of the annual conference in Engelberg, students and post-doctoral students develop project studies, which are discussed in-depth at the conference.

So far, the following annual topics have been addressed:

- 2002: «From Global Inequity towards a Humane World»
- 2003: «Pervasive Computing»
- 2004: «Will Climate Change The World»
- 2005: «Taboos on Decision-Making in the Healthcare System»
- 2006: «Rethinking our Energy Future»
- 2007: «Water – Private or Public Good?»
- 2008: «Growth – Constraint or Opportunity?»
- 2009: «Violence in Human Society»
- 2010: «Challenging Democracy»
- 2011: «Personalized Medicine»
- 2012: «Cities of the Future»
- 2013: «The Future of the Welfare State»
- 2014: «Food Security»
- 2015: «Future Economic Systems»
- 2016: «At the Limits»

The "ENGELBERG DIALOGUES 2018" will take place from 14 October to 17 October. The theme of the event is "Unlimited Migration?".

== Follow-up Events ==
Special and in-depth events are conducted on the individual annual topics. Thus, a follow-up event to the 2003 conference on the topic of «The Transparent Citizen» took place in April 2005.

In November 2005, we conducted a meeting, "European Research Area and Beyond", in cooperation with the Swiss State Secretariat for Education and Research and the Swiss Federal Institute of Technology in Zurich as part of an international discussion forum on science policies.

In August 2008, a follow-up event to the 2007 conference on the subject of «The Climate Change Challenge» was organized. In January, 2012, the seminar «The Environment and the Free Market», with a multitude of philosophical questions, was conducted in Vaduz.

== Projects ==
The results of the discussions held at the annual conference are turned into projects. With their realization by post-doctoral students and students (YES alumni, Swiss Study Foundation) in particular, awareness on the applicable subject is raised and a contribution is made to the elimination of global inequities. From 2005 to 2008, the International Student Initiative for Action on Climate Change (ISIACC) successfully worked on the project «Stop Deforestation» in Latin America. A workshop in Egypt with members of the international organization Youth Encounter on Sustainability (YES) on the subject of water management was held in early November 2008 as a follow-up project to the 2007 conference.
