= Ulrich Holbein =

German writer (born 1953)

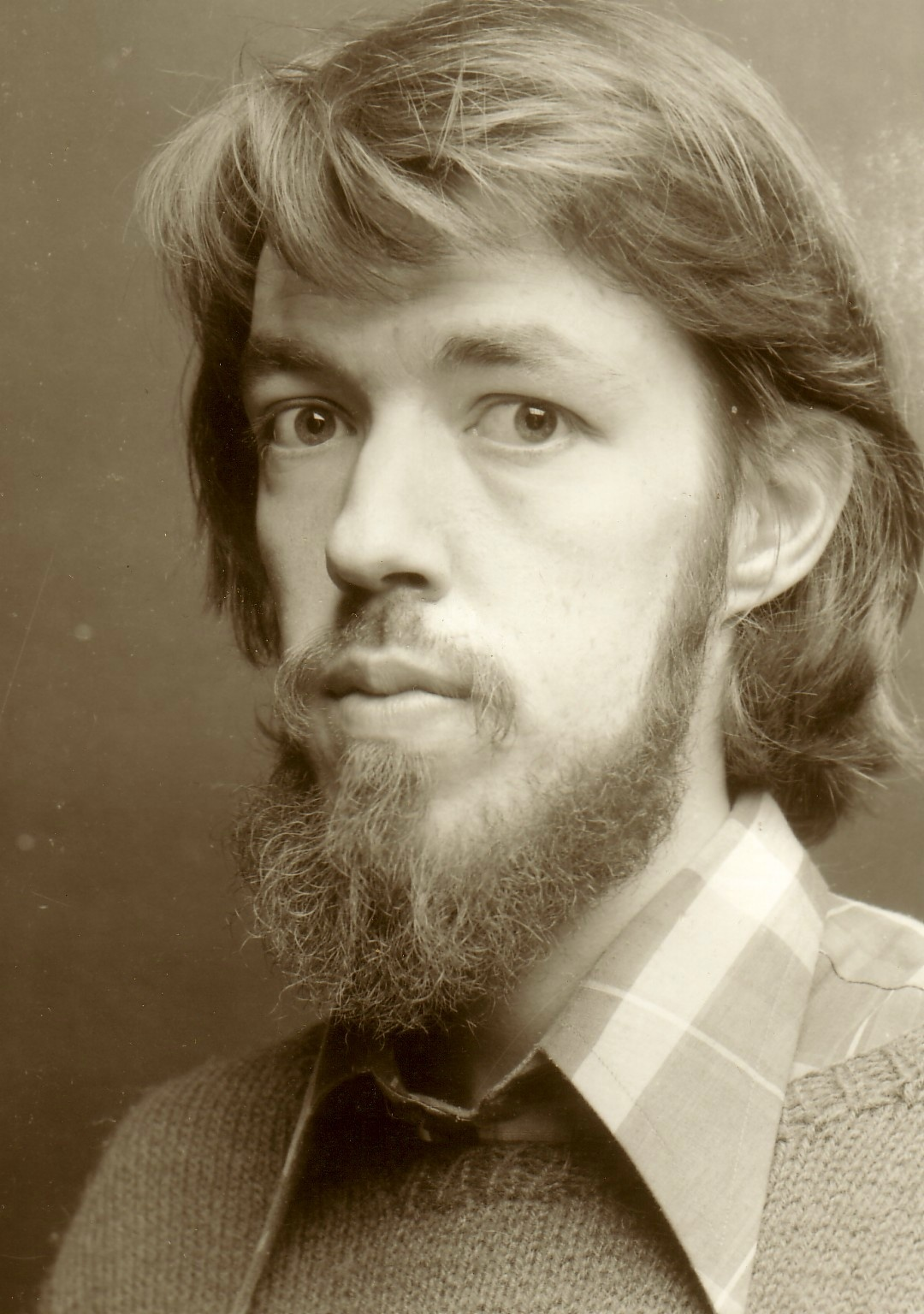
Ulrich Holbein, 1980

Ulrich Holbein (born January 24, 1953, in Erfurt) is a German writer. Holbein was the winner of the 2003 Hugo Ball Prize and winner of the 2012 Kassel Literary Prize.

Holbein employs a number of pseudonyms, including Uriel Bohnlich, Heino Brichnull, Heinrich Bullo, and Lili Chonhuber.
