= Christa Dichgans =

German artist (1940–2018)

Christa Dichgans

Christa Dichgans (1940-2018) was a German painter, associated with the Pop Art movement.

== Biography ==
Dichgans was born in Berlin, Germany in 1940 and studied painting at the Hochschule der Künste, Berlin and the German National Academic Foundation (Studienstiftung des Deutschen Volkes).

In 1966 she received a scholarship from the German National Academic Foundation and moved to New York City, returning to Europe to live in Rome the following year. From 1972 on she lived in Berlin and La Haute Carpénée in the south of France. Between 1984 and 1988, she worked as assistant to Georg Baselitz at the Hochschule der Künste, Berlin.

Dichgans died in 2018 in Berlin.

== Public collections ==
Her work is held in a number of public collections including:

- Berlinische Galerie
- Kirchliches Museen Würzburg
- Kunstmuseum Bonn
- Kunstverein Schloß Wertingen
- Neue Nationalgalerie. Berlin
- Sammlung des Deutschen Bundestages, Berlin
- Städtische Galerie Viersen

== See also ==
- List of German painters
