= Ernst Kretschmer (linguist) =

German linguistics professor

Ernst Kretschmer (born 3 July 1951) is a linguistics professor at the University of Modena and Reggio Emilia, and the 1990 winner of the Kassel Literary Prize.
