= Philipp Tingler =

Swiss-German writer, journalist and economist

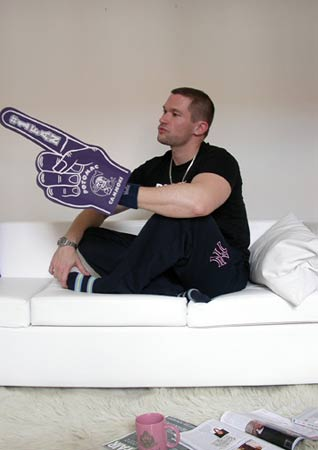
Philipp Tingler

Philipp Tingler (born 1970 in West Berlin) is a Swiss and German writer, journalist, economist and philosopher. His literary and essayistic work is an ironic comedy of manners, focused on minds and styles in the upper realms of society.

== Biography ==
Tingler studied Economics and Philosophy at the University of St. Gallen (Switzerland), the London School of Economics and Political Science, and the University of Zurich. He was awarded a scholarship by the prestigious German National Academic Foundation (Studienstiftung des deutschen Volkes) and wrote his PhD thesis on the topic of Immanuel Kant's transcendental idealism and its influence on the works of German writer Thomas Mann, particularly Mann's aesthetic theory and philosophy of history.

During his time as a student, Tingler worked as a model, e.g., for Smart compact cars, Alcatel mobile phones, and Lusso ice cream. He also published his first novel, the bestselling roman à clef entitled Hübsche Versuche (German for "Nice Tries") which assumes the form of a diary. This debut secured Tingler the annual literary prize of the Swiss canton of Zurich in 2001. In the same year, he was nominated for the Ingeborg-Bachmann-Preis, awarded yearly in Klagenfurt, Austria, as one of the more important awards for younger writers of Germanophone literature. Tingler's performance in Klagenfurt, however, caused quite a stir and turned out be highly controversial, since he did not at all conformed to the conventions of the traditional German-speaking literary scene. Exactly that milieu became one of the targets in his second book, Ich bin ein Profi, published in 2003.

Besides his literary work, Tingler writes for TV and radio as well as for numerous magazines and newspapers in the German-speaking world, such as Vogue, Stern, Focus, and NZZ am Sonntag. He is the author of a travel column for Welt am Sonntag, Germany's biggest upscale Sunday newspaper, and writes a fashion column for the German edition of Condé Nast's Gentlemen's Quarterly / GO. He is also a regular contributor to the avantgarde German car-and-culture magazine Ramp.

With a fastidious eye on appearances and social mannerisms, his often self-depreciating humour, and his richly detailed descriptive style, Tingler's literary work fits into the tradition of an urban and ironic comedy of manners. He satirises society, its superficiality, dynamics and figures, often with knowing, sometimes thinly-disguised portraits. As a chronicler and commentator of human types and characteristics (as well as the essential aloofness of the writer as an artist), some of his central themes are the subtle (and not-so subtle) signals of class and social distinction, the upkeep of appearances and facades, and the tragicomical failure in light of society's demands. His writing is spiked with a certain appetite for gossip as well as elements of parody and persiflage and many references to the Anglo-Saxon world and popular culture.

In 2008, Tingler was awarded the Kassel Literary Prize for Young Authors in recognition of the humorous quality of his work at a high artistic level, not least for his novel Fischtal (2007) which portrayed the decay of a bourgeois patrician family in West Berlin. His latest novel, a modern-day adaption of the myth of Doktor Faust, aptly entitled Doktor Phil, which contains one of the most charming devils in modern literature, was published in March 2010.

Tingler lives in Zurich, Switzerland. He is married to a British-Swiss partner who features prominently in some of his writings, always highlighted as "the best husband of them all".

== Awards ==
- Ehrengabe des Kantons Zürich für Literatur 2001
- Förderpreis zum Kasseler Literaturpreis für grotesken Humor 2008

== Works ==
- Hübsche Versuche. Edition Patrick Frey, Zürich 2000, ISBN 3-905509-26-1
- Ich bin ein Profi. Edition Patrick Frey, Zürich 2003, ISBN 3-905509-45-8
- Juwelen des Schicksals. Kurze Prosa. Kein & Aber, Zürich 2005, ISBN 3-0369-5131-8
- Leute von Welt. Kurze Prosa. Kein & Aber, Zürich 2006, ISBN 3-0369-5171-7
- Fischtal. Roman. Kein & Aber, Zürich 2007, ISBN 978-3-0369-5506-3
- Stil zeigen! Handbuch für Gesellschaft und Umgangsform. Kein & Aber, 2008, ISBN 978-3-0369-5520-9
- Doktor Phil, Kein & Aber, 2010, ISBN 978-3-0369-5557-5
- Leichter Reisen – Benimmhandbuch und Ratgeber für unterwegs. Edition Kein & Aber, Zürich 2011, ISBN 978-3-0369-5592-6.
- Wie frei sind wir noch? – Eine Streitschrift für den Liberalismus.Edition Kein & Aber, Zürich 2011, ISBN 978-3-0369-5658-9
- Das Abc des guten Benehmens. CD. Edition Kein & Aber, 2008, ISBN 978-3-0369-1241-7
- Dichtung und Kritik. Thomas Mann und der transzendentale Idealismus. Diss. phil. Zürich, 2009
