= Kassel Literary Prize =

German literary award

The Kassel Literary Prize for Grotesque Humor (Kasseler Literaturpreis für grotesken Humor), established 1985, is an annual prize awarded by the city of Kassel and the Brückner-Kühner foundation in recognition of "grotesque and comic work" at a high artistic level. Prior to 1996, it was also given to literary professors whose work is connected to this theme. The prize includes an award of 10,000 euros.

The foundation has, since 2004, also awarded authors under the age of 35 the Förderpreis Komische Literatur. This prize includes an award of 3,000 euros.

Prior to 2006, the awards were given in November, this was moved to the following February the next year, resulting in the "2006/2007" prizes.

== Recipients since 2004 ==
Year	Literaturpreisträger (Main literary prize)	Förderpreis (under 35)
2004	Ror Wolf	Jochen Schmidt
2005	Katja Lange-Müller	Tilman Rammstedt
2006/2007	Gerhard Polt	Jess Jochimsen
2008	F. W. Bernstein	Philipp Tingler
2009	Peter Rühmkorf	Michael Stauffer
2010	Herbert Achternbusch	Rebekka Kricheldorf
2011	Thomas Kapielski	Jan Neumann
2012	Ulrich Holbein	Tino Hanekamp
2013	Wilhelm Genazino	Wolfram Lotz
2014	Dieter Hildebrandt	
2015	Frank Schulz	Arno Camenisch
2016	Wolf Haas	Kirsten Fuchs
2017	Karen Duve	Ferdinand Schmalz
2018	Eckhard Henscheid	Dagmara Kraus [de]
2019	Sibylle Berg	Jakob Nolte
2020	Heinz Strunk	Chrizzi Heinen
2021	Felicitas Hoppe	Lukas Linder
2022	Helge Schneider	Anaïs Meier
2023	Gerhard Henschel	Noemi Somalvico
2024	Joachim Meyerhoff	Nele Pollatschek
2025	Nora Gomringer	Stefanie Sargnagel
2026	Marc-Uwe Kling	

== Recipients prior to 2004 ==
- 1985: Loriot
- 1986: Eike Christian Hirsch
- 1987: Ernst Jandl
- 1988: Wolfgang Preisendanz
- 1989: Irmtraud Morgner
- 1990: Ernst Kretschmer
- 1991: Robert Gernhardt
- 1992: Walter Hinck
- 1993: Christoph Meckel
- 1994: Volker Klotz
- 1995: Hanns Dieter Hüsch
- 1996: Karl Riha
- 1997: Max Goldt
- 1998: Franzobel
- 1999: Ingomar von Kieseritzky
- 2000: Peter Bichsel
- 2001: George Tabori
- 2002: Franz Hohler
- 2003: Eugen Egner

== See also ==
- German literature
- List of literary awards
- List of poetry awards
- List of years in literature
- List of years in poetry
