= Wilhelm von Wolfenschiessen =

Landammann of Nidwalden (died 1403)

- Died: 1403
- Title: Landammann of Nidwalden
- Term: 1396, 1400, 1403
- Spouse: Katharina (surname unknown)

Wilhelm von Wolfenschiessen (first mentioned 1367; died 1403) was Landammann (chief magistrate) of Nidwalden in 1396, 1400, and 1403, alternating with his cousin Ulrich. He played an important part in the Ringgenberg affair of 1380–1381.

== Biography ==
Wilhelm von Wolfenschiessen was a member of the Wolfenschiessen family. He married Katharina, whose surname is unknown; she came from the Hasli valley and brought property in Meiringen into the marriage. He was the father of Arnold. Because the family's Amstein line does not appear in the records for several decades, Wilhelm and his cousin Ulrich cannot be placed in its genealogy.

Wilhelm was Landammann of Nidwalden in 1396, 1400, and 1403, alternating with his cousin Ulrich. In 1400 he was an envoy to a Confederate court of arbitration, and he was also a judge. He played an important part in the Ringgenberg affair (Ringgenberger Handel) of 1380–1381, and at the same time he waged a feud against Interlaken Monastery. In 1389 he was one of the plaintiffs against the community (Ürtner) of Ennetmoos.

== Bibliography ==
- K. von Deschwanden, "Urkundliches Verzeichniss der Landammänner, Vorgesetzten und Amtsleute des Landes Unterwalden nid dem Wald", in Der Geschichtsfreund, 26, 1871, 22–24
- D. Rogger, Obwaldner Landwirtschaft im Spätmittelalter, 1989, 125–136
