= Eike Christian Hirsch =

German journalist and author (1937–2022)

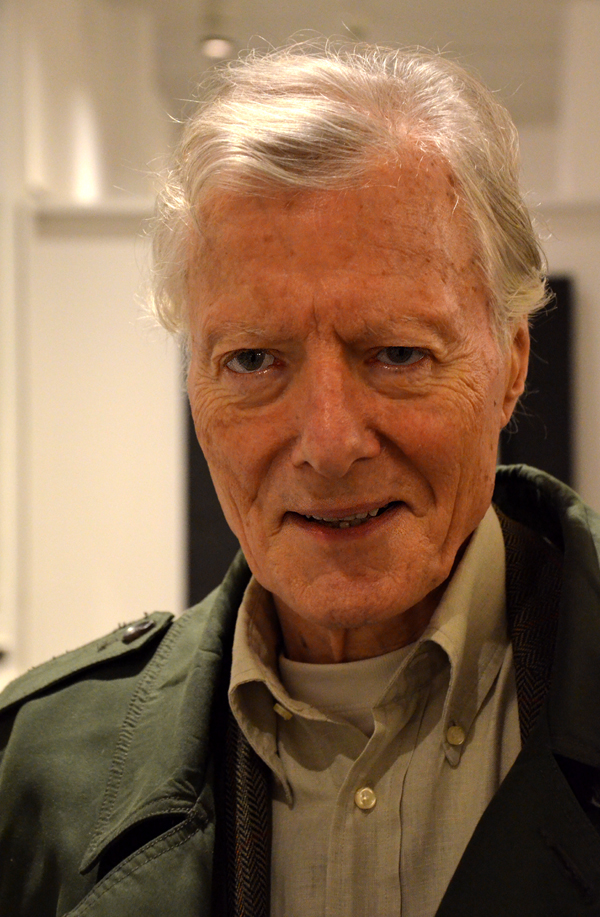
- Hirsch in 2015
- Born: 6 April 1937; Bilthoven, Netherlands
- Died: 7 August 2022 (aged 85); Hannover, Lower Saxony, Germany
- Education: University of Göttingen; Heidelberg University; University of Basel
- Occupations: Journalist; Author; Television presenter
- Organizations: Norddeutscher Rundfunk (NDR)
- Awards: Kassel Literary Prize; Lower Saxony State Prize (Niedersachsenpreis)

Eike Christian Hirsch (6 April 1937 – 7 August 2022) was a German journalist, author and television presenter. He was host of a talk show and author of a biography about Gottfried Wilhelm Leibniz. The main themes in his books were religion, humour and German language.

== Biography ==
Hirsch was born in Bilthoven, Netherlands, on 6 April 1937 and grew up in Göttingen. His playmates were the children of the family of Werner Heisenberg among others, and a classmate was a son of Carl Friedrich von Weizsäcker.

Hirsch studied theology and philosophy in Göttingen, Heidelberg, and finally in Basel with Karl Barth. He graduated to Dr. theol. with a work on Immanuel Kant, Höchstes Gut und Reich Gottes in Kants kritischen Hauptwerken als Beispiel für die Säkularisierung seiner Metaphysik (Highest good and Kingdom of God in Kant's main works as an example of the secularisation of his metaphysics). Up to 1996, he was an editor in sound broadcasting at the NDR and headed the "Religion and Society" department. He was later a freelance journalist. In the 1980s, he was the host of the talk show 3 nach 9. He wrote books on questions of faith and the German language. He also wrote a series of humorous word definitions, Deutsch für Besserwisser (German for know-it-alls), which were first published in Stern magazine, and later collected into book form.

In 2000, Hirsch wrote his opus magnum Der berühmte Herr Leibniz (The famous Mr. Leibniz) about the German polymath Gottfried Wilhelm Leibniz, who had worked in Hanover. A reviewer from the FAZ noted that Hirsch avoided speculation, but provided facts in rich detail in chronological narration.

Hirsch lived in Hanover. Hirsch was married to Doreen. Even in old age, he and his wife went to a fitness centre twice a week, and he relaxed with classical music such as Schubert's.

Hirsch died in Hannover on 7 August 2022 of a severe illness, at the age of 85.

== Awards ==
In 1986, Hirsch was awarded the Kassel Literary Prize, for grotesque humour for his amusing interpretation (Der Witzableiter oder die Schule des Lachens, 1985). In 1992, he received the Lower Saxony State Prize (Niedersachsenpreis) for Journalism. In 2006, he received the Kurt Morawietz Literature Prize donated by the Sparkasse Hannover.

== Works ==
- Deutsch für Besserwisser (in German). Hamburg: Hoffmann und Campe. 1976. ISBN 3-455-03350-4. OCLC 2640976.
- Mehr Deutsch für Besserwisser (in German). Deutscher Taschenbuch. 1988. ISBN 978-3-423-10992-5. OCLC 24987181.
- Hirsch, Eike Christian (1989). Expedition in die Glaubenswelt 32 Proben auf das Christentum (in German). München. ISBN 978-3-423-11047-1. OCLC 75043780.
- Den Leuten aufs Maul : ein- und ausfälle vom besserwisser (in German). Hamburg: Hoffmann und Campe. 1982. ISBN 978-3-455-08705-5. OCLC 987961895.
- Hirsch, Eike Christian (2001). Der Witzableiter oder die Schule des Lachens (in German). München. ISBN 978-3-406-47560-3. OCLC 76286300.
- Hirsch, Eike Christian (1993). Vorsicht auf der Himmelsleiter Auskünfte in Glaubensfragen (in German). München. ISBN 978-3-423-30351-4. OCLC 75321473.
- Kopfsalat : Spott-Reportagen für Besserwisser (in German). Hamburg: Hoffman und Campe. 1988. ISBN 3-455-08287-4. OCLC 21594421.
- Hirsch, Eike Christian (1991). Wort und Totschlag peinliche Pointen (in German). Hamburg. ISBN 978-3-455-08389-7. OCLC 74910406.
- Im Haus des Seidenspinners : roman (in German). Hamburg: Hoffmann und Campe. 1993. ISBN 3-455-03352-0. OCLC 28699292.
- Mein Wort in Gottes Ohr : ein Glaube, der Vernunft annimmt (in German). Hamburg: Hoffmann und Campe. 1995. ISBN 3-455-11055-X. OCLC 36036014.
- Hirsch, Eike Christian (2016). Der berühmte Herr Leibniz : eine Biographie (in German). München. ISBN 978-3-406-70137-5. OCLC 957179412.
- Gnadenlos gut : Ausflüge in das neue Deutsch (in German). München: Beck. 2004. ISBN 3-406-52304-8. OCLC 56492232.
- Hirsch, Eike Christian (2008). Deutsch kommt gut Sprachvergnügen für Besserwisser (in German). München. ISBN 978-3-406-56814-5. OCLC 222344552.
- Hirsch, Eike Christian (2012), Warum wir Leibniz noch brauchen - oder - Der begehbare Kopf (in German), Göttingen Academy of Sciences, doi:10.26015/ADWDOCS-318, hdl:11858/00-001S-0000-0007-5EA3-6
