= Tino Hanekamp =

German journalist and author (born 1979)

Tino Hanekamp (born 1979) is a German journalist and author. In 2012, he was awarded the Förderpreis Komische Literatur, for his first novel So was von da.
