= Preis der Literaturhäuser =

German literary award

Preis der Literaturhäuser is a German literary prize. Since 2002, it has been awarded to German authors annually by the Netzwerk der Literaturhäuser during the Leipziger Buchmesse for exceptional text and presentation skills. The prize contains a reading tour through the 17 Literaturhäuser in Germany and €20,000, as well as a eulogy in honor of the author in all 17 Literaturhäuser.

== Award winners ==
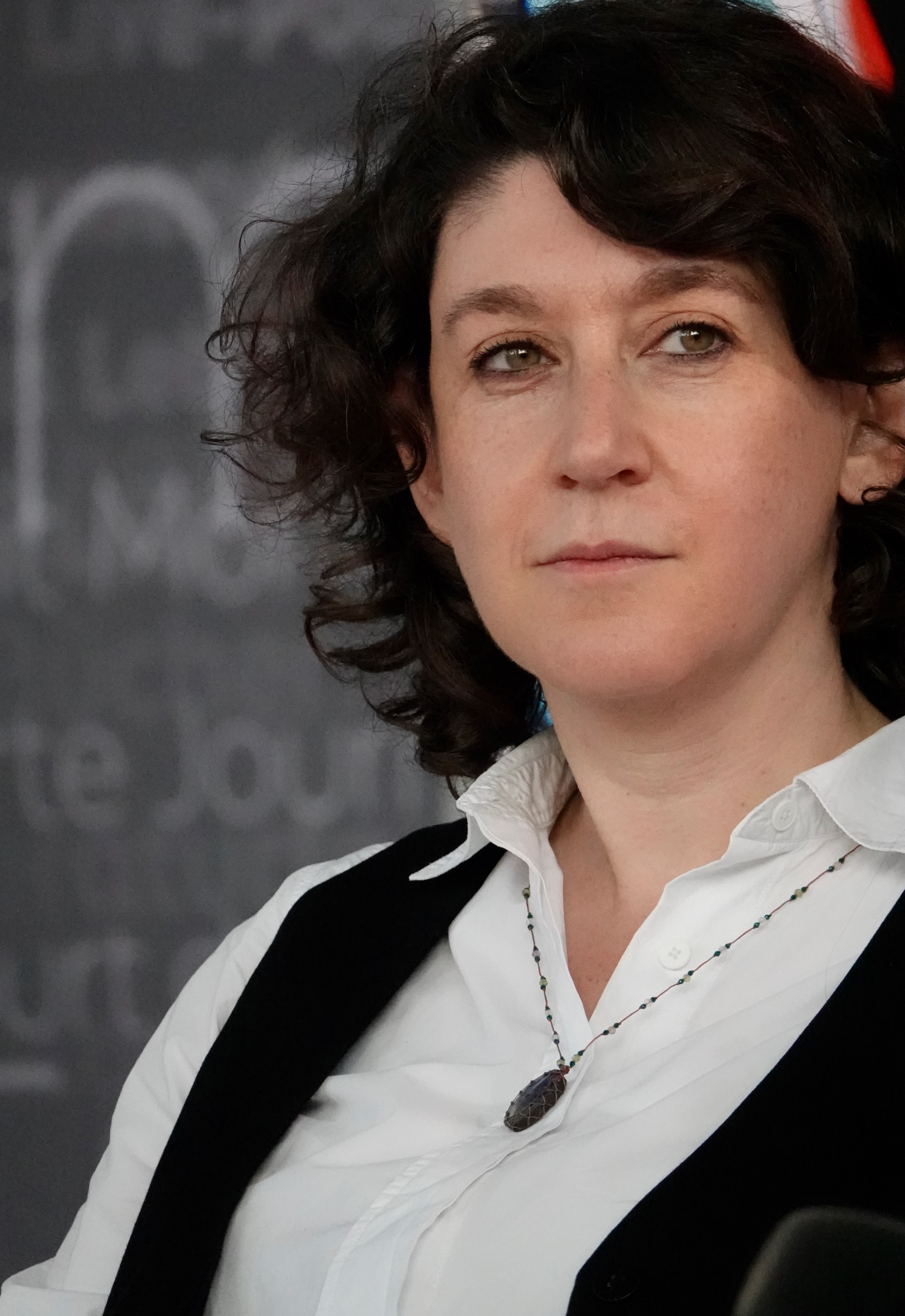
Lena Gorelik at Leipziger Buchmesse 2026

- 2002 Ulrike Draesner
- 2003 Bodo Hell
- 2004 Peter Kurzeck
- 2005 Michael Lentz
- 2006 Uwe Kolbe
- 2007 Sibylle Lewitscharoff
- 2008 Anselm Glück
- 2009 Ilija Trojanow
- 2010 Thomas Kapielski
- 2011 Elke Erb
- 2012 Feridun Zaimoglu
- 2013 Hanns Zischler
- 2014 Judith Schalansky
- 2015 Nicolas Mahler
- 2016 Ulf Stolterfoht
- 2017 Terézia Mora
- 2018 Jaroslav Rudiš
- 2019 Antje Rávic Strubel
- 2020 Marlene Streeruwitz
- 2021 Ingo Schulze
- 2022 Sasha Marianna Salzmann
- 2024 Fiston Mwanza Mujila
- 2026 Lena Gorelik
