= Walter Hinck =

German Germanist and writer

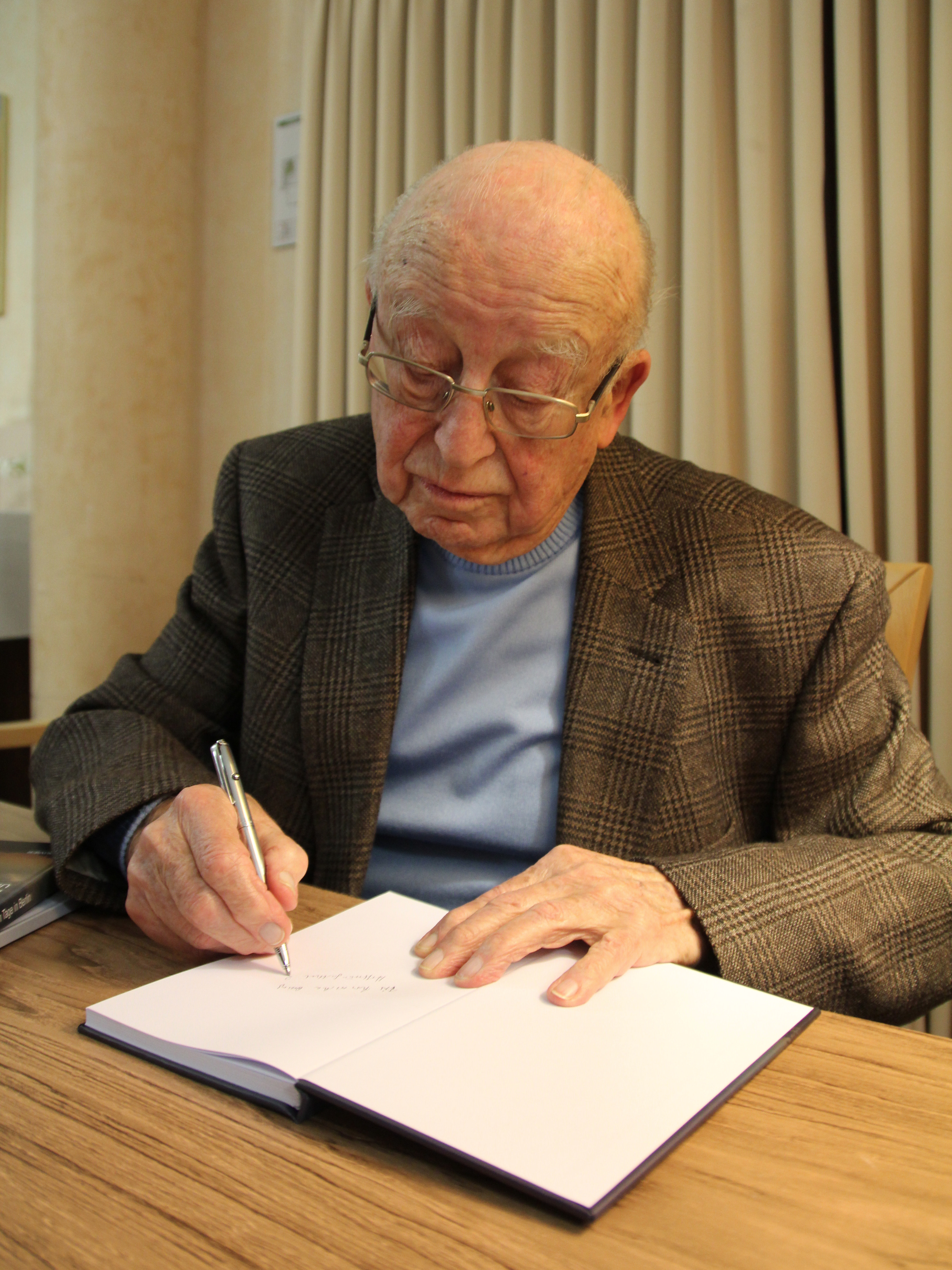
- Hinck in 2013
- Born: 8 March 1922; Selsingen, Nether saxony, Germany
- Died: 21 August 2015 (aged 93); Landau, Rhineland Palatinate, Germany
- Occupations: Germanist and writer
- Years active: 1964–1987 (professor)

Walter Hinck (8 March 1922 – 21 August 2015) was a German Germanist and writer. He was professor of German literature at the University of Cologne from 1964 to 1987.

== Life and career ==
Born in Selsingen, Hinck served in the Wehrmacht after his Abitur in 1940 and was a prisoner of war until 1950. In 1956 Hinck earned his doctorate at the Georg-August-Universität Göttingen with the dissertation "Die Dramaturgie des späten Brecht" (The Dramaturgy of the Late Brecht) and worked there from 1957 to 1962 as scientific assistant at the Seminar for German philology. In 1962 he moved to the Christian-Albrechts-Universität zu Kiel as an assistant, where he obtained his habilitation in 1964.

From 1964 to 1987 he was Professor of Modern German Language and Literature at the University of Cologne. His work focused on German drama from the 18th to the 20th century, and contemporary poetry. He was a member of the PEN Centre Germany and since 1974 a member of the North Rhine-Westphalian Academy of Sciences, Humanities and the Arts. He was a corresponding member since 2009. Hinck wrote a large number of essays as well as narrative literature.

From 1965 to 2010 he lived with his wife in Rösrath. Since 2010 they lived in Landau in Landau in der Pfalz. He was awarded the Kassel Literary Prize (1992) and the prize of the Frankfurter Anthologie (2003).

Hinck died in Landau at age 92.

== Publications ==
- Das moderne Drama in Deutschland. Göttingen 1973, ISBN 3-525-01204-7.
- Das Gedicht als Spiegel der Dichter. Zur Geschichte des deutschen poetologischen Gedichts. VS Verlag für Sozialwissenschaften, 1985, ISBN 3-531-07273-0.
- Germanistik als Literaturkritik. Zur Gegenwartsliteratur. Suhrkamp, Frankfurt am Main 1988, ISBN 3-518-37385-4.
- Die Wunde Deutschland. Heinrich Heines Dichtung im Widerstreit von Nationalidee, Judentum und Antisemitismus. Frankfurt am Main 1990, ISBN 3-458-16117-1.
- Theater der Hoffnung. Von der Aufklärung bis zur Gegenwart. Suhrkamp, Frankfurt am Main 1991, ISBN 3-518-37995-X.
- Walter Jens Un homme de lettres. Zum 70. Geburtstag. Kindler, 1993, ISBN 3-463-40171-1.
- Magie und Tagtraum: Das Selbstbild des Dichters in der deutschen Lyrik. Insel Verlag, 1994, ISBN 3-458-16650-5.
- Geschichtsdichtung. Vandenhoeck & Ruprecht, 1995, ISBN 3-525-01357-4.
- Das moderne Drama in Deutschland. Vom expressionistischen zum dokumentarischen Theater. Vandenhoeck + Ruprecht, 1997, ISBN 3-525-01204-7.
- Die Dramaturgie des späten Brecht. (Palaestra. 229). Vandenhoeck + Ruprecht, 1997, ISBN 3-525-20537-6.
- Im Wechsel der Zeiten. Leben und Literatur. Bouvier, 1998, ISBN 3-416-02804-X.
- Stationen der deutschen Lyrik. Von Luther bis in die Gegenwart. Göttingen 2000.
- als Hrsg.: Jahrhundertchronik. Deutsche Erzählungen des 20. Jahrhunderts. Philipp Reclam jun., Stuttgart 2000, ISBN 3-15-050030-3.
- Goethe – Mann des Theaters. Vandenhoeck & Ruprecht, 2002, ISBN 3-525-33478-8.
- Selbstannäherungen. Autobiographien im 20. Jahrhundert von Elias Canetti bis Marcel Reich-Ranicki. Artemis & Winkler, Düsseldorf/ Zürich 2004. (Auch als Lizenzausgabe für die Wissenschaftliche Buchgesellschaft)
- Roman-Chronik des 20. Jahrhunderts. Eine bewegte Zeit im Spiegel der Literatur. DuMont, Cologne 2006, ISBN 3-8321-7984-4.
- Wahrnehmung des Lebens: Vom Schreiben im Nebenberuf. Bouvier, Bonn 2008, ISBN 978-3-416-03177-6.
- Jahrgang 1922. Biographische Skizzen. Bouvier, Bonn 2011, ISBN 978-3-416-03345-9.
- Die letzten Tage in Berlin. Drei Erzählungen, postface by Ulla Hahn. Bouvier, Bonn 2011, ISBN 978-3-416-03346-6.
- Gesang der Verbannten. Deutschsprachige Exillyrik von Ulrich von Hutten bis Bertolt Brecht. Reclam, Stuttgart 2011, ISBN 978-3-15-010835-2.
- Wenn aus Liebesversen Elegien werden. Über verlorene Illusionen. Zehn Erzählungen. Bouvier, Bonn 2015, ISBN 978-3-416-03381-7.
