= Ulrich von Wolfenschiessen (fl. 1398–1402) =

Landammann of Nidwalden (fl. 1398–1402)

- Title: Landammann of Nidwalden
- Term: 1398, 1399, 1402

Ulrich von Wolfenschiessen (first mentioned 1398; last mentioned 1402) was Landammann (chief magistrate) of Nidwalden in 1398, 1399, and 1402, alternating with his cousin Wilhelm. In 1402 he presided over the court that ruled on a dispute between villagers of Buochs and the abbot of Engelberg Abbey.

== Biography ==
Ulrich von Wolfenschiessen was a member of the Wolfenschiessen family. He lived at the Hobacher in Oberdorf and owned the tower in Niderwil, in the municipality of Dallenwil. Because the family's Amstein line does not appear in the records for several decades, Ulrich and his cousin Wilhelm cannot be placed in its genealogy.

Ulrich was Landammann in 1398, 1399, and 1402, alternating with his cousin Wilhelm. In 1399 he appears in various contracts, and in the same year he affixed his seal to the village statutes (Dorfrecht) of Buochs. In 1402 he presided over the court that ruled on the dispute between villagers of Buochs and the abbot of Engelberg Abbey.

== Bibliography ==
- K. von Deschwanden, "Urkundliches Verzeichniss der Landammänner, Vorgesetzten und Amtsleute des Landes Unterwalden nid dem Wald", in Der Geschichtsfreund, 26, 1871, 22–24
