= Thomas Kapielski =

German author (born 1951)

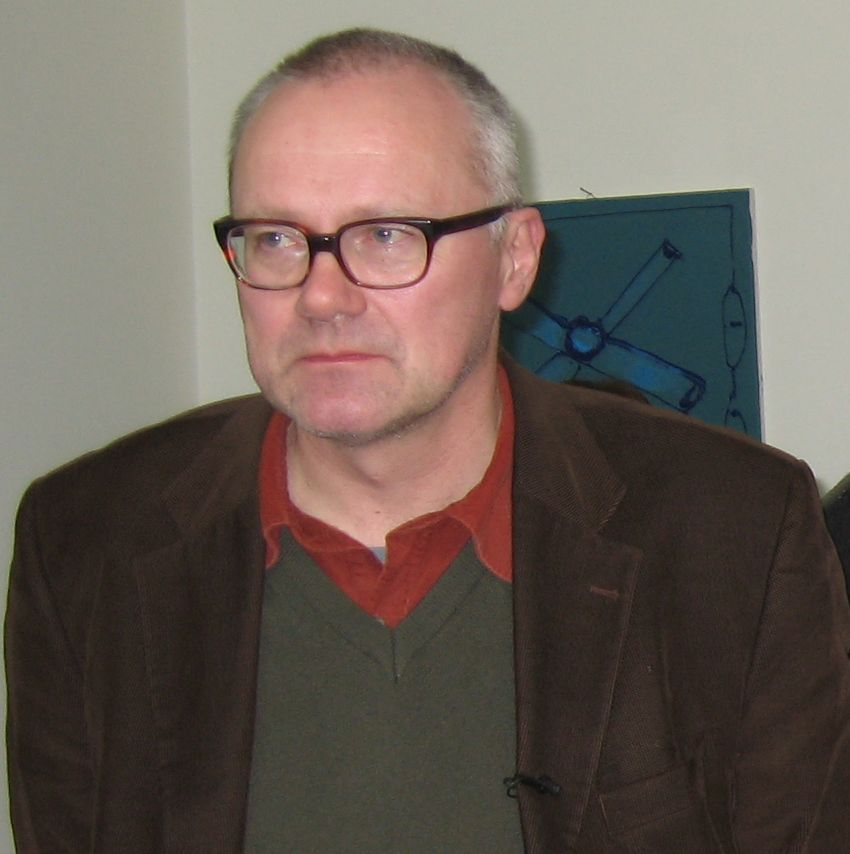
- Kapielski in 2006
- Born: Thomas Alfred Francis Kapielski; 1951 (age 73–74)
- Occupations: author; literary critic; visual artist; musician
- Awards: Preis der Literaturhäuser (2010); Kassel Literary Prize (2011)

Thomas Alfred Francis Kapielski (born 1951) is a German author, literary critic, visual artist and musician. He won the 2011 Kassel Literary Prize and the 2010 Preis der Literaturhäuser.
