= Ulrich von Wolfenschiessen (fl. 1334–1373) =

Landammann of Unterwalden (14th century)

- Title: Landammann
- Term: 1348, 1350
- Father: Johann von Wolfenschiessen

Ulrich von Wolfenschiessen (first mentioned 1334; last mentioned 1373) was Landammann (chief magistrate) in 1348 and 1350, and in 1350 he represented the whole of Unterwalden in that office. He administered the landholdings of Engelberg Abbey.

== Biography ==
Ulrich von Wolfenschiessen was a member of the Wolfenschiessen family and the son of Johann.

In 1334 Ulrich was Ammann of Wolfenschiessen, and in 1348 Landammann in Stans and ennend dem Kernwalde ("beyond the Kernwald"). In 1350 he served as a judge in Stans, and in the same year, as Landammann, he represented the whole of Unterwalden. He administered the landholdings of Engelberg Abbey, and in 1357 he was explicitly referred to as the abbey's Amtmann (steward).

== Bibliography ==
- K. von Deschwanden, "Urkundliches Verzeichniss der Landammänner, Vorgesetzten und Amtsleute des Landes Unterwalden nid dem Wald", in Der Geschichtsfreund, 26, 1871, 15–19
