= Wolfgang Preisendanz =

Wolfgang Preisendanz (April 28, 1920 – September 29, 2007) was a German philologist and literary critic.

Preisendanz was the winner of the 1988 Kassel Literary Prize.
