= Schweizerische Studienstiftung =

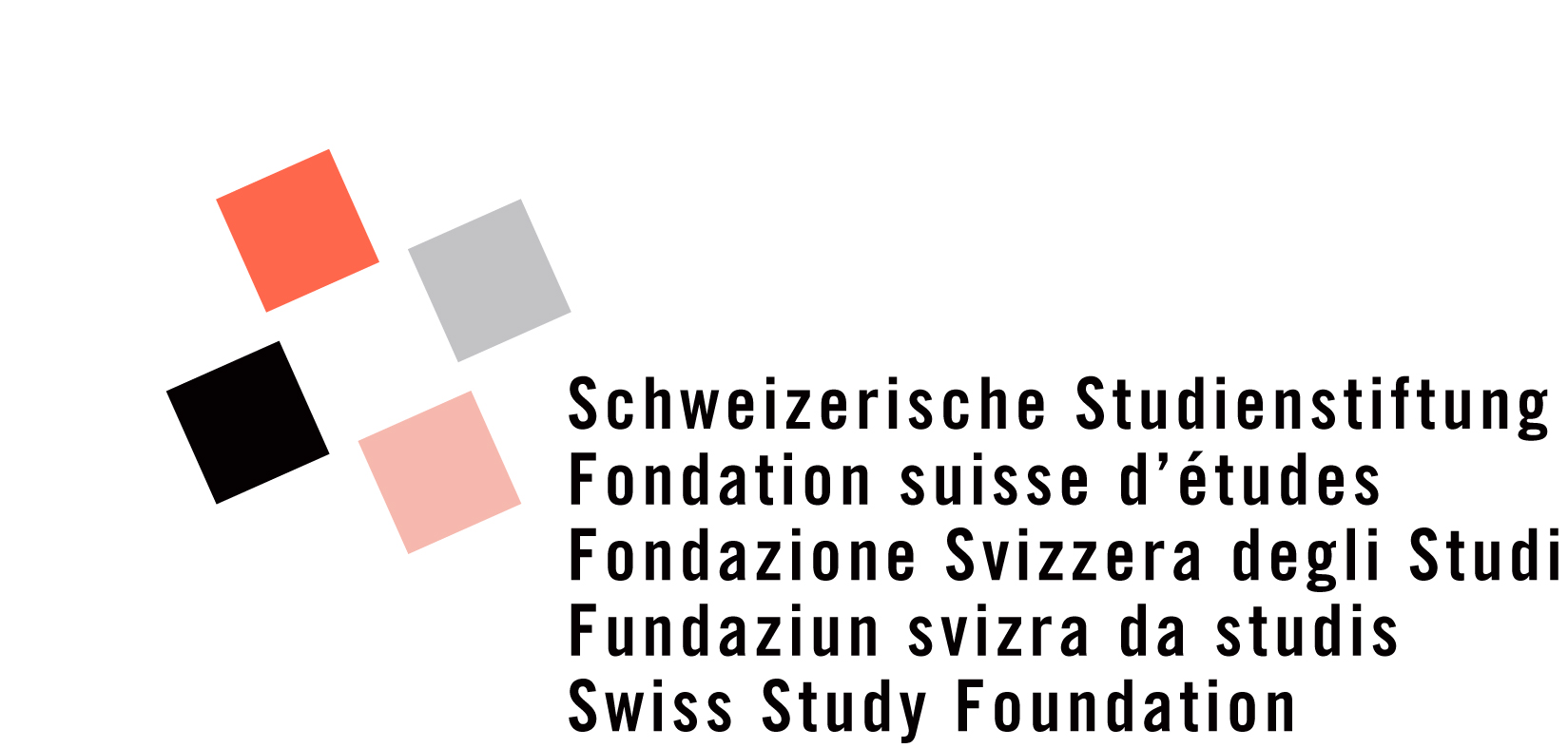
Logo

The Swiss Study Foundation (German "Schweizerische Studienstiftung", French "Fondation suisse d'études") is a foundation that promotes outstanding students (top 0.3%) during their undergraduate and postgraduate studies. Requirements for admission are outstanding intellectual interests and capabilities, creativity, and character.

The Swiss Study Foundation was founded 1991 in analogy to the Studienstiftung des deutschen Volkes, its German equivalent. Currently, 988 students are in the programme.

== Notable alumni ==
- Caroline Jaden Stussi, actress
- Balthasar Glättli, politician
- Daniel Hellmann, performance artist
- Oliver Schmitt, historian

== See also ==
- Studienstiftung des deutschen Volkes
- National Merit Scholarship Program
