= Bundespräsident =

Bundespräsident (President of the Federation or Federal President) is the German language title for:

- The President of Austria (head of state)
- The President of Germany (head of state)
- The President of the Swiss Confederation: the presiding member of the Swiss Federal Council (the collective head of state and head of government)

Bundespräsident is the title for males, females are titled Bundespräsidentin. The correct style of addressing is for females "Frau Bundespräsidentin" and for males "Herr Bundespräsident".
