= La Fête du Slip =

Swiss alternative-porn film festival

- Status: active
- Genre: multidisciplinary alternative-porn festival
- Begins: 2012
- Frequency: annually
- Venue: Les Docks, Le Bourg, Théâtre Arsenic, Théâtre Sévelin 36, Forma Art Contemportain, Librairie HumuS, Pully CityClub
- Location: Lausanne, Switzerland
- Country: Switzerland
- Years active: 4
- Inaugurated: 2012
- Founder: Viviane & Stéphane Morey
- Website: www.lafeteduslip.ch

La Fête du Slip (literally "Panties Fest" or "Underpants Fest") is an annual alternative-porn film festival held in Lausanne, Switzerland. It is Romandy's first and biggest multidisciplinary festival whose sole purpose is to focus on body, gender, and sexuality in art. It takes places during the first week-end of March since 2012.

== Description ==
La Fête du Slip is a festival celebrating diversity in bodies, gender and sexuality. It offers a select and diverse program of cinema, music, visual and performing arts, literature, and porn.

La Fête du Slip looks for contemporary emerging art. Its programming evolves around innovative and subversive works. Artistic projects transcending categories and proposing new forms of experimentation are favored.

By bringing together different artworks that have an echo in their content, the festival aims at enriching the experience of its audience by creating unexpected encounters between artists.

== History and background ==
=== Edition 0 ===
Took place on 9 March 2012. 2 venues, 4 events, 4 artists, 675 in attendance.

=== 1st Edition ===
Took place between the 8th and 10 March 2013. 4 venues, 28 events, 32 artists, 1'840 in attendance.

=== 2nd Edition ===
Took place between 6 and 9 March 2014. 5 venues, 30 events, 42 artists, 1'870 in attendance.

=== 3rd Edition ===
Took place between 6 and 8 March 2015. 6 venues, 40 events, 46 artists, 2'800 in attendance.

=== 4th Edition ===
Took place between 4 and 6 March 2016. 7 venues, 63 events, 75 artists, 3'400 in attendance.

== Hosting ==
La Fête du Slip takes place in seven venues in Lausanne: theaters, nightclubs, galleries, and cinema.

== Les Préliminaires ==
Each edition gets an early kick-start with a party called Les Préliminaires (literally "The Foreplays") which take place one week before the actual beginning of the festival. The initial goal of this event was to raise funds for the festival. However, having grown in size and larger funds being involved and needed way ahead of time, this party's function is less of a fund raiser. It is now mostly a way for the festival enthusiasts to take a first pulse of the upcoming events and to discover the program in details.

== Audience ==
The audience of La Fête du Slip is diverse. The variety of the program and the venues creates a unique blend, ranging from queer punks to old literature enthusiasts, dance specialists, and hipsters. With its thematic color, La Fête du Slip attracts sub-cultures, like the LGBT community, the BDSM/kink/fetish community, feminist activists, pornographers, sex workers, or gender studies researchers. Most of its audience is local, but the festival attracts a growing number of international festival-goers each year. As a Paris-Match article put it in 2015: "Switzerland was famous for its banks and chocolates, and now it has been shining with its own porn festival for three years."

== Le Slip d'Or ==
Since 2015, La Fête du Slip hosts an International Sex Positive Porn Competition called Le Slip d'Or, whose aim is to promote and reward the best of the burgeoning sex positive porn scene internationally.

=== Spirit of the Competition ===
As Annie Sprinkle puts it: "The answer to bad porn isn't no porn... It's to try and make better porn!". By acknowledging that a better, more subversive, empowering and liberated porn is being made, La Fête du Slip's International Sex Positive Porn Competition brings together the porn performers, producers, distributors and consumers and makes this new cultural sector successful.

By way of appeal for submission, worldwide pornographers are invited to send their sex positive porn films. A jury made of respected and well-known professionals then selects the ones that, according to them, are the more representative of a fresh and bold porn, while still remaining significantly marginal, and while authentically and humorously questioning the various definitions of pornography, sex, and gender. Among these selected films, ten are further nominated for the grand prize: Le Slip d’Or.

=== Structure, Criteria, Prizes ===
La Fête du Slip's International Sex Positive Porn Competition has three concentric sections, with three prizes :

- Le Fap d’Or

This competitive section is open to all sex positive porn films, regardless of year of production, premiere status and duration. The films selected in the two more selective sections, Le Prix du Public and the Slip d’Or are included in this section automatically. Only the accredited professionals of the festival may vote for their favorite film, and the winner will receive the Fap d’Or prize.

- Le Prix du Public

This competitive section is limited to films of duration of less than 20 min, released in the 12 months prior to the submission deadline. Premiere status is not relevant. The audience of the festival will vote for their favorite film by paper ballot. The winner will win the Prix du Public prize.

- The Official Competition - Le Slip d’Or

A smaller selection of films will be in the official competition. A jury of three porn film professionals will judge these films. This competitive section is limited to films shorter than 20 minutes, released in the 12 months prior to the submission deadline, and films presenting at least their international premiere at La Fête du Slip, and Swiss premiere for Swiss films. The winner selected by the jury will receive the Slip d’Or prize
