= Ulrike Müßig =

German jurist and legal historian (born 1968)

Ulrike Müßig (née Seif, born 1968 in Würzburg) is a German jurist and legal historian as well as Head of the Chair for Civil Law, German and European Legal History at the University of Passau.

== Academic education and career ==
Ulrike Müßig studied law in Würzburg (DE) and Cambridge (GB). She spent time at the Paris-Panthéon-Assas University (FR) as a visiting student. After the First State Examination in 1993, she received the doctoral scholarship of the Studienstiftung at the Institute for Comparative Law at the University of Würzburg (DE) and at the Max-Planck-Institute for foreign and international private law in Hamburg. She was awarded her doctorate in 1995. Müßig became a postdoctoral scholar at the Institute for Bavarian and German Legal History at the University of Würzburg at the chair of Professor Dietmar Willoweit from 1996 to 1999, after having completed her traineeship for her Assesorexamen in Würzburg, Brussels and Paris.

Müßig’s time at Willoweit’s chair culminated in her postdoctoral qualification (habilitation) in 2000 at the Law Faculty of the University of Würzburg in the fields of European and German Legal history, Civil Law, Comparative Law, and International Private Law. The habilitation ‘Recht und Justizhoheit’ concerning Legal History received the Heisenberg Prize of the DFG (German Research Foundation) and a second edition in 2009. In the same year of her habilitation (2000), Ulrike Müßig was appointed to the Chair for Civil Law and German and European Legal History at the University of Passau, rejecting an offered chair at Bielefeld University. An offer by the University of Bern had been rejected in 2003.

== Research focus ==
Müßig’s scientific work focuses on European Constitutional History (12th–21st century) including the contemporary history of the European integration, the history of supreme jurisdiction, the Roman-canonical law of succession in medieval German legal recordings as well as the history of ideas of the 18th century. She contributed heavily to the Companion of German Legal History, the Encyclopaedia of Modern Age and the Oxford International Encyclopaedia of Legal History. She currently is co-editor of the ‘Grundlagen der Rechtswissenschaft’ (Foundations of Legal Science) published by Mohr Siebeck; initially together with Horst Dreier and Michael Stolleis, now with Marietta Auer.

Ulrike Müßig regularly holds presentations that combine legal-historical considerations with current issues at the invitation of national and international universities and the media. In addition to analysing art and mathematics in law, her most recent publications have focused on procedural justice and human dignity. A Chinese translation of her book ‘Reason and Fairness Constituting Justice in Europe, from Medieval Canon Law to ECHR’ was published in 2024. A characteristic of her work is the goal to maintain the historical disciplines as a part of legal education, to create conditions for interdisciplinary research, and to enable an international exchange of ideas and the promotion of graduates. Müßig has employed and mentored numerous PhD candidates at her chair, many of whom have pursued academic careers and received their own chairs. Theses submitted at her chair range from Civil Law and International Law to Comparative Constitutional Legal History in the 19th and 20th century as well as legal questions regarding 17th-century publication practices.

== Distinctions and memberships ==
During her own studies, Müßig received the scholarship for highly gifted students of the Bavarian Hundhammerstiftung, the German National Academic Foundation’s scholarship (Studienstiftung des Deutschen Volkes), and the study abroad scholarship of the DAAD. In 1996, Ulrike Müßig has been awarded the Bavarian Habilitation Prize (Bayerischer Habilitationsförderpreis 1996), the Prize of the Lower Franconian Gedenkjahresstiftung for Science 1997 (Preis der Unterfränkischen Gedenkjahresstiftung für Wissenschaft 1997), and the Heisenberg Prize of the DFG in 2000 for her scientific achievements. In 2008, she was nominated for the Gerda-Henkel-Prize. Müßig was Dean of the Faculty of Law of the University of Passau from 2010 to 2012.

She is a corresponding member of the historic-judicial class at the National Academy al Andalus since 2014 (Ilustre Sociedad Andaluza de Estudios Histórico-Jurídicos). She has been a member of the Equipo de investigación of the Justicia y Memoria Histórica project since 2022. In 2013, Müßig received the ERC Advanced Grant (1.9 million €) for her research project ReConFort (‘Reconsidering Constitutional Formation in 18th and 19th century Europe’) on European Constitutional History, which resulted in the creation of the ReConFort Research Blog in 2019. In April 2015 she was elected into the historical-philosophical class of the Austrian Academy of Sciences. She became professeur invitée at the faculty of law of the Université Paris II Panthéon-Assas in 2019, followed by an invitation as professor invitée at the faculty of law at the Université Paris I Panthéon-Sorbonne 2023, at the Universities of Macerata and Gdańsk 2024.
