= Engelberg Abbey =

Benedictine monastery in Engelberg, Canton of Obwalden, Switzerland

Coordinates: 46°49′14″N 8°24′35″E

Engelberg Abbey Kloster Engelberg
- 1236–1602 / 1798
- Flag Coat of arms

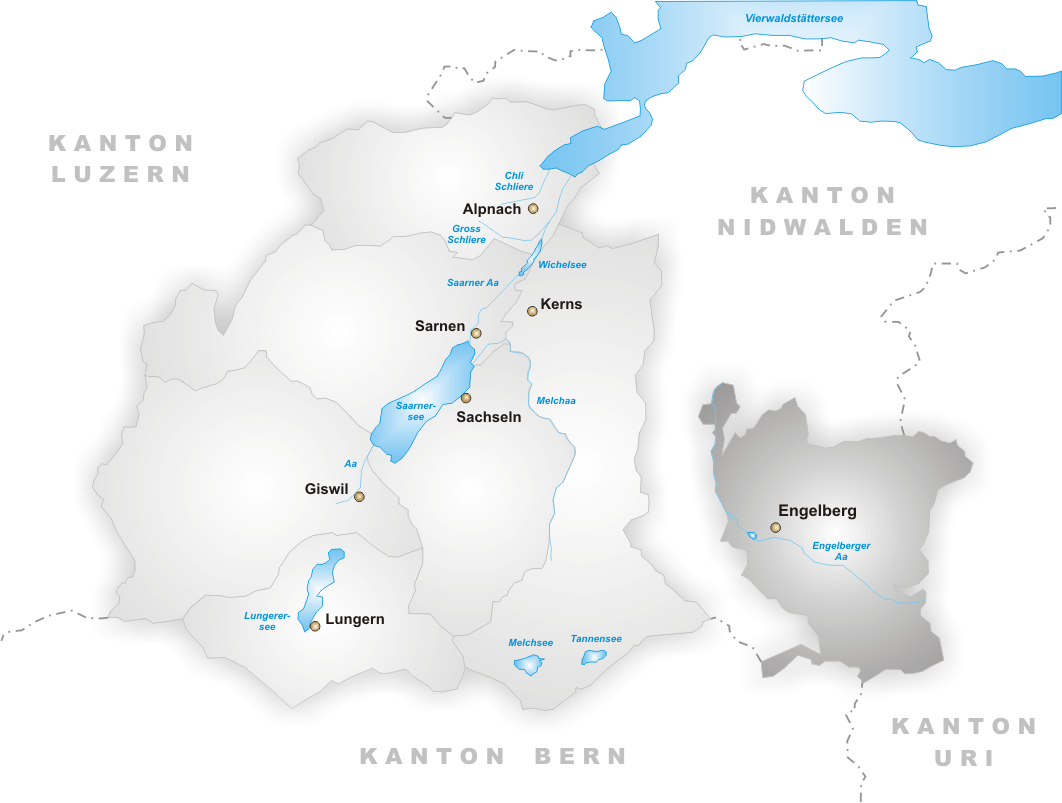
- Modern municipality of Engelberg, within Obwalden
- Status: Imperial abbey
- Capital: Engelberg Abbey
- Common languages: Highest Alemannic
- Historical era: Middle Ages
  - Founded: 1120
  - Gained immediacy under the Holy See: 1124 1236
  - Gained jurisdiction over local villages: 1236
  - Swiss Congregation created: 1602
  - Annexed by Helv. Rep.: 1798
Preceded by	Succeeded by
St. Blaise's Abbey in the Black Forest	Canton of Waldstätten

Engelberg Abbey (German: Kloster Engelberg) is a Benedictine monastery in Engelberg, Canton of Obwalden, Switzerland. It was formerly in the Diocese of Constance, but is now in the Diocese of Chur. It is dedicated to Our Lady of the Angels and occupies a commanding position at the head of the Nidwalden Valley.

== History ==
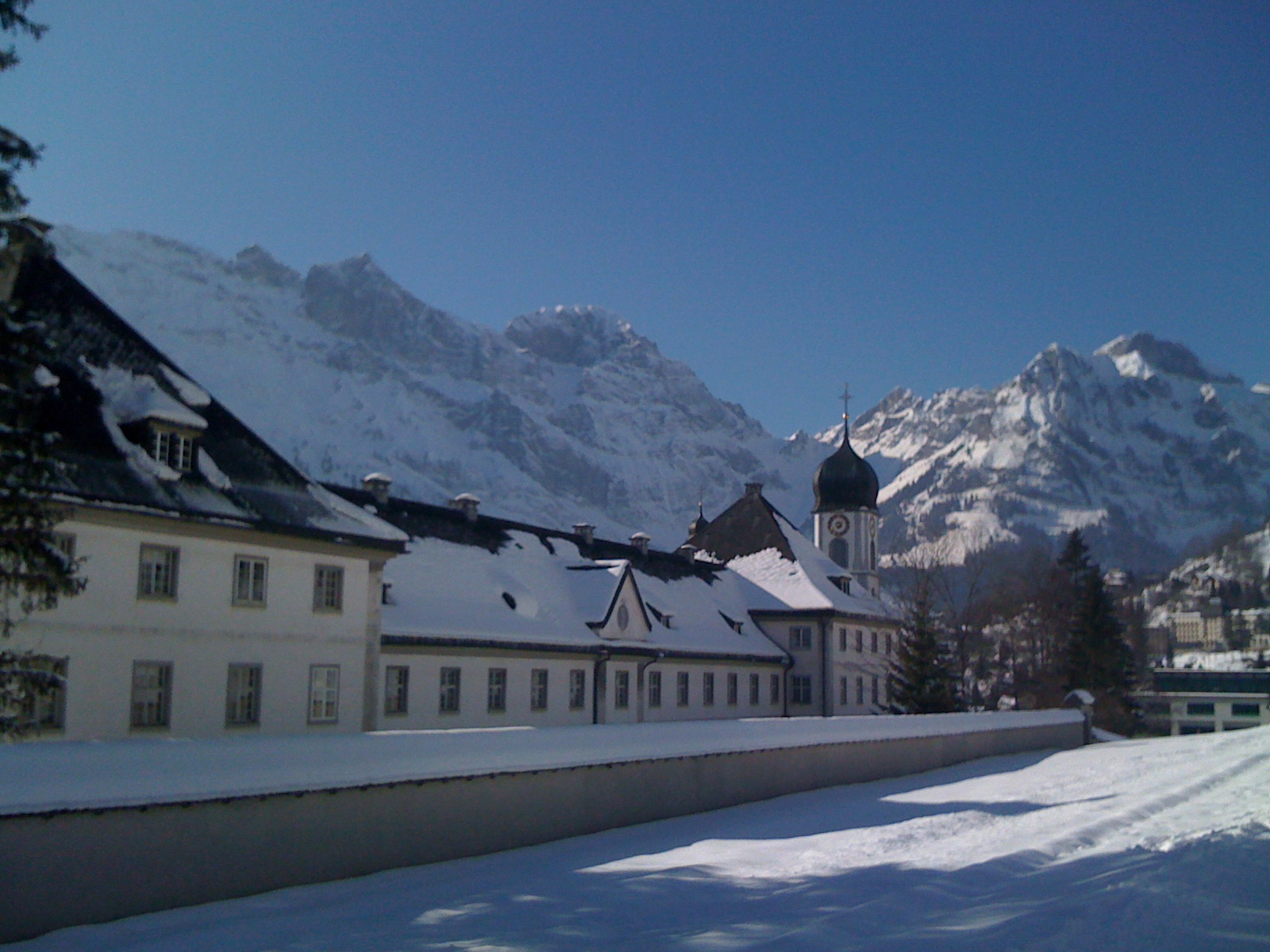
The Abbey in winter

The Engelberg abbey was founded on the 1 April 1120 by Count Conrad of Sellenbüren, and its first abbot was Adelhelm, a monk of Muri Abbey. The first inhabitants of Engelberg were also monks from the Muri abbey. Von Sellenbüren entered the Engelberg abbey as a monk and died on the 2 Mai 1126.

Pope Callistus II and the Emperor Henry IV both officially acknowledged the abbey in 1124. The abbey was placed under the immediate jurisdiction of the Holy See, who put it under protection by Saint Peter. In November 1224 Emperor Henry VI then also officially put the abbey under his protection. In the founding documents, the new abbey was known as Mons Angelorum and Engilberc.

Adelhelm, abbot until 1126, was followed by three disputed abbots which divided the community. They were followed by three abbots from St. Blaise's Abbey in the Black Forest, Frowin (1143/47-1178), Berchtold (1178-1197) and Henry (1197-1223). Under Frowin a scriptorium was founded. Around 1200 the Engelberger Meister wrote and illustrated several books from the scriptorium. Since Frowin, the abbey was a so-called double monastery, in which both nuns and monks lived. The nuns established the Saint Andreas monastery in Sarnen in 1615.

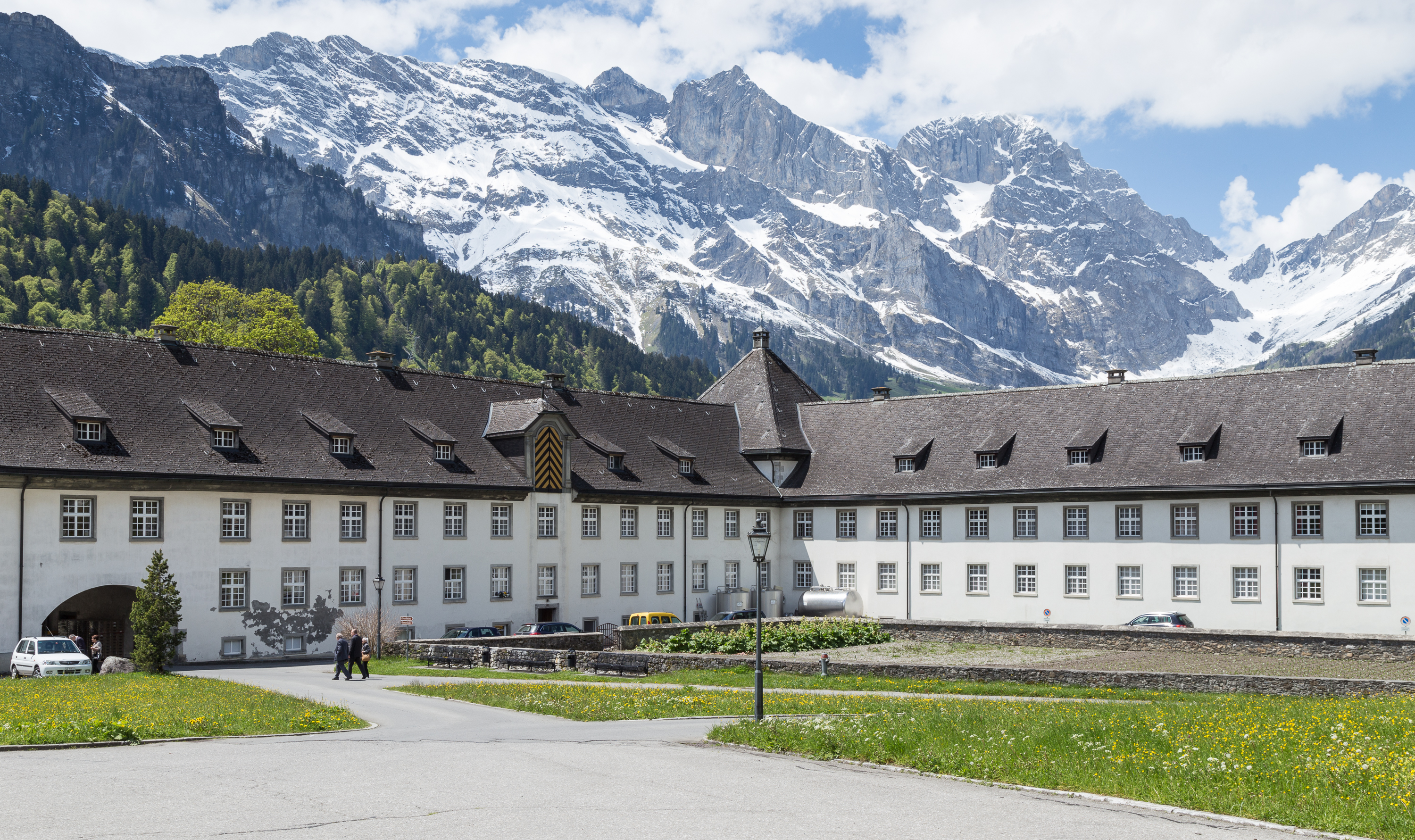
The courtyard of Engelberg Abbey

In spiritual matters the abbots of Engelberg exercised quasi-episcopal jurisdiction over all their vassals and dependents, including the town which sprang up around the walls of the abbey, and also enjoyed the right of collation to all the parishes of the Canton.

In temporal matters they had supreme and absolute authority over a large territory, embracing one hundred and fifteen towns and villages, which were incorporated under the abbatial rule by a Bull of Pope Gregory IX in 1236. These and other rights they enjoyed until the French Revolution, in 1798, when most of them were taken away. Its population diminished several times by the plague in the years 1349, 1548 and 1565. In 1565, only one priest who was on service in Küssnacht survived of the community.

The prominent position in Switzerland which the abbey occupied for so many centuries was seriously threatened by the religious and political disturbances of the Reformation period, especially by the rapid spread of the teachings of Zwingli, and for a time its privileges suffered some curtailment.

In 1602 Engelberg joined with other houses to form the Swiss Congregation of the Benedictine Confederation.

The troubles and vicissitudes, however, through which it passed, were happily brought to an end by the wise rule of Abbot Benedict Sigrist in the 17th century, who is justly called the restorer of his monastery. Alienated possessions and rights were recovered by him and the good work he began was continued by his successors, under whom monastic discipline and learning have flourished with renewed vigour. The library, which is said to have contained over twenty thousand volumes and two hundred choice manuscripts, was pillaged by the French in 1798. Ironically, in the spirit of learning and preservation of knowledge, the library contains to this day a complete set of the writings of Martin Luther. The abbey buildings were almost entirely destroyed by fire in 1729 but were rebuilt in a substantial style and so remain to the present day.

In 1873 a colony from Engelberg founded Conception Abbey, at Conception, Missouri in the United States; in 1882, Mount Angel Abbey was founded near what is now Mount Angel, Oregon, also in the United States.

William Wordsworth wrote a poem about the abbey entitled "Engelberg, The Hill of Angels".

== Educational institutions of the monastery ==
Since 1851, there exists the Boarding School of the Abbey Engelberg, which was first performed by a secular rector since 2009. 2001, the Academia Engelberg Foundation was founded.
