= George Lucas filmography =

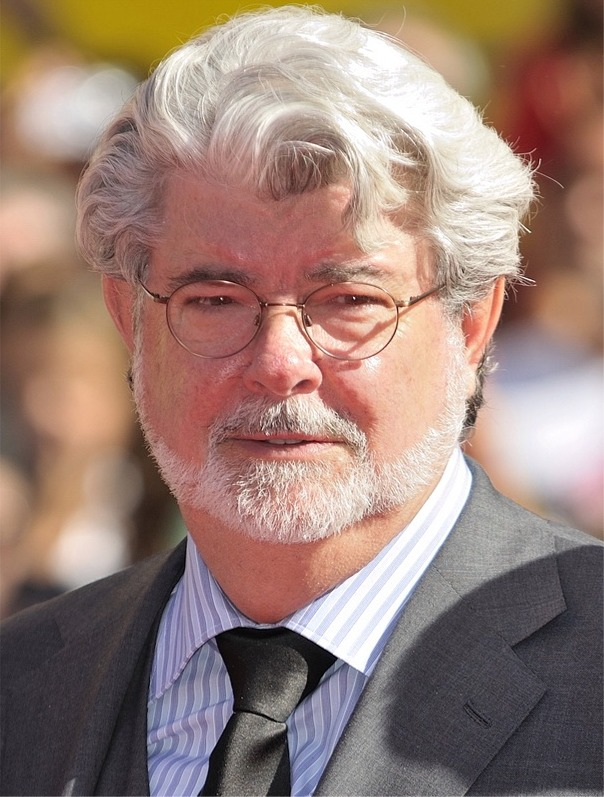
George Lucas

George Lucas (born May 14, 1944) is an American film director, screenwriter, producer, editor, and entrepreneur. A member of the New Hollywood movement, his best-known work includes both the Star Wars and Indiana Jones franchises and establishing Lucasfilm.

Lucas made his feature film debut in 1971 with THX 1138, an expansion of his student short Electronic Labyrinth: THX 1138 4EB made at the University of Southern California. Two years later, he wrote and directed American Graffiti, based on his own experience of cruising and years as a teenager. He then wrote and directed the space opera Star Wars (1977): it became the highest grossing film of all time and launched an eponymous franchise. Although Lucas did not direct the following two films in the Original Trilogy—The Empire Strikes Back (1980) and Return of the Jedi (1983)—he was heavily involved in creative control. Some two decades later, he returned to full-time directing and wrote all three entries in the prequel trilogy: The Phantom Menace (1999), Attack of the Clones (2002), and Revenge of the Sith (2005).

== Feature films ==
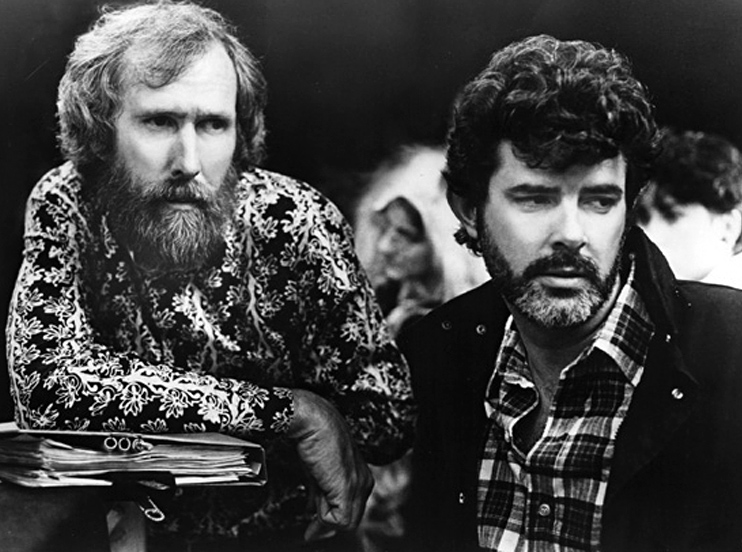
Lucas with Jim Henson in 1986

Table featuring films by George Lucas
Year	Title	Director	Writer	Executive producer	Notes	Ref(s).
1971	THX 1138	Yes	Yes	No	Also editor	
1973	American Graffiti	Yes	Yes	No		
1977	Star Wars	Yes	Yes	Yes	Also editor (uncredited)	
1979	More American Graffiti	No	No	Yes		
1980	Kagemusha	No	No	Yes	Produced the international version	
1980	The Empire Strikes Back	No	Story	Yes	Also screenwriter, second unit director, and editor (uncredited).	
1981	Raiders of the Lost Ark	No	Story	Yes		
1983	Return of the Jedi	No	Yes	Yes	Also second unit director and editor (uncredited).	
1983	Twice Upon a Time	No	No	Yes		
1984	Indiana Jones and the Temple of Doom	No	Story	Yes		
1985	Mishima: A Life in Four Chapters	No	No	Yes		
1986	Labyrinth	No	No	Yes		
1986	Howard the Duck	No	No	Yes		
1988	Willow	No	Story	Yes		
1988	Tucker: The Man and His Dream	No	No	Yes		
1988	The Land Before Time	No	No	Yes		
1989	Indiana Jones and the Last Crusade	No	Story	Yes		
1994	Radioland Murders	No	Story	Yes	Also second unit director	
1999	Star Wars: Episode I – The Phantom Menace	Yes	Yes	Yes	Also editor (uncredited)	
2002	Star Wars: Episode II – Attack of the Clones	Yes	Yes	Yes	Also editor (uncredited)	
2005	Star Wars: Episode III – Revenge of the Sith	Yes	Yes	Yes	Also editor (uncredited)	
2008	Indiana Jones and the Kingdom of the Crystal Skull	No	Story	Yes		
2008	Star Wars: The Clone Wars	No	No	Yes		
2012	Red Tails	No	No	Yes	Also director of reshoots (uncredited)	
2015	Strange Magic	No	Story	Yes		
2023	Indiana Jones and the Dial of Destiny	No	No	Yes		

== Short films and attractions ==
Year	Title	Director	Writer	Executive producer	Editor	Cinematographer	Notes
1965	Look at Life	Yes	Uncredited	No	Uncredited	Uncredited	
1966	Herbie	Yes	Uncredited	No	Uncredited	Uncredited	Co-directed with Paul Golding
1966	Freiheit	Yes	Uncredited	No	Uncredited	Uncredited	
1966	1:42.08	Yes	Yes	No	Yes	Yes	Documentary film
1967	Anyone Lived in a Pretty How Town	Yes	Screenplay	No	Uncredited	Uncredited	
1967	The Emperor	Yes	Yes	No	No	No	Documentary film
1967	Electronic Labyrinth: THX 1138 4EB	Yes	Yes	No	Uncredited	No	
1967	6-18-67	Yes	Uncredited	No	Uncredited	Uncredited	Documentary film
1968	Filmmaker	Yes	Yes	No	Yes	Yes	Documentary film; also sound
1986	Captain EO	No	Screenplay	Yes	No	No	Attraction film for Disney theme parks
1987	To Know Him Is to Love Him	Yes	No	No	No	No	Music video for Trio (Dolly Parton, Linda Ronstadt, and Emmylou Harris)
1987	Star Tours	No	No	Yes	No	No	Attraction film for Disney theme parks
2011	Star Tours – The Adventures Continue	No	No	Yes	No	No	Attraction film for Disney theme parks

== Television films and series ==
Year(s)	Title	Writer	Executive producer	Notes
1984	The Ewok Adventure	Story	Yes	Television film
1985	Ewoks: The Battle for Endor	Story	Yes	Television film
1986	Inside the Labyrinth	No	Yes	Documentary television film
1992–1996, 1999–2001	The Young Indiana Jones Chronicles	Creator & Stories	Yes	28 episodes + 4 television films / 22 television films
2007–2008	The Adventures of Young Indiana Jones Documentaries	No	Yes	Documentary series; 94 episodes + 3 Lectures
2008–2014, 2020	Star Wars: The Clone Wars	Creator	Yes	133 episodes + 4 in Legacy / Conceived all stories
2010	The Nina Foch Course for Filmmakers and Actors	No	Yes	Documentary series for DVD; 16 episodes
2012	Double Victory: The Tuskegee Airmen at War	No	Yes	Documentary television film
2012	Manifest Destiny	No	Yes	Documentary series; 3 episodes
2026	Star Wars Detours	Creator	Yes	Limited released, 6 episodes

Young Indiana Jones story writing credits

The Young Indiana Jones Chronicles (original TV release)		The Adventures of Young Indiana Jones (re-edited for VHS/DVD)		
Season	Episode	Volume	Chapter	Segment
1	1. "Young Indiana Jones and the Curse of the Jackal"	I. The Early Years	1. My First Adventure	I. "Egypt"
1	1. "Young Indiana Jones and the Curse of the Jackal"	I. The Early Years	6. Spring Break Adventure	II. "Mexico"
1	2. "London, May 1916"	I. The Early Years	7. Love's Sweet Song	II. "London"
1	3. "British East Africa, September 1909"	I. The Early Years	2. Passion for Life	I. "British East Africa"
1	4. "Verdun, September 1916"	II. The War Years	9. Demons of Deception	I. "Verdun"
1	5. "German East Africa, December 1916"	II. The War Years	11. Oganga, the Giver and Taker of Life	I. "German East Africa"
1	6. "Congo, January 1917"	II. The War Years	11. Oganga, the Giver and Taker of Life	II. "Congo"
2	1. "Austria, March 1917"	II. The War Years	13. Adventures in the Secret Service	I. "Austria"
2	2. "Somme, Early August 1916"	II. The War Years	8. Trenches of Hell	I. "Somme"
2	3. "Germany, Mid-August 1916"	II. The War Years	8. Trenches of Hell	II. "Germany"
2	4. "Barcelona, May 1917"	II. The War Years	14. Espionage Escapades	I. "Barcelona"
2	7. "Petrograd, July 1917"	II. The War Years	13. Adventures in the Secret Service	II. "Petrograd"
2	9. "Vienna, November 1908"	I. The Early Years	3. The Perils of Cupid	I. "Vienna"
2	13. "Paris, September 1908"	I. The Early Years	2. Passion for Life	II. "Paris"
2	14. "Peking, March 1910"	I. The Early Years	5. Journey of Radiance	II. "Peking"
2	15. "Benares, January 1910"	I. The Early Years	5. Journey of Radiance	I. "Benares"
2	16. "Paris, October 1916"	II. The War Years	9. Demons of Deception	II. "Paris"

== Other media ==
=== Books ===
==== Author ====
Title	Year	Notes	Universe
Star Wars: From the Adventures of Luke Skywalker	1976	Credited author (ghostwritten by Alan Dean Foster)	Star Wars (novelization for first film)
Shadow Moon	1995	Co-writing credit with Chris Claremont	Willow (Chronicles of the Shadow War trilogy)
Shadow Dawn	1996	Written by Chris Claremont from a story by George Lucas	Willow (Chronicles of the Shadow War trilogy)
Shadow Star	2000	Written by Chris Claremont from a story by George Lucas	Willow (Chronicles of the Shadow War trilogy)

==== Adaptations unproduced episodes of Star Wars: The Clone Wars series ====
Title	Year	Notes
Darth Maul: Son of Dathomir	2014	Comic adaption of four unproduced episodes by Jeremy Barlow (based on screenplays by Aida Croal & Matt Michnovetz)
Star Wars: Dark Disciple	2015	Novel adaption of eight unproduced episodes by Christie Golden (based on screenplays by Katie Lucas & Matt Michnovetz & Dave Filoni)

=== Multimedia products for PC ===
George Lucas developed and produced variety multimedia content for CD-ROM:

- GTV: A Geographic Perspective on American History (1990)
- Life Story: The Race for the Double Helix (1990)
- The Mystery of the Disappearing Ducks (1993)
- Interactive Timeline The Adventures of Young Indiana Jones DVD (2007)

== Unreleased and unrealized projects ==
Title	Writer	Executive producer	Notes
The Young Indiana Jones Chronicles	Creator & Stories	Yes	Many stories were written but never filmed due to the series cancellation.
Star Wars: The Clone Wars	Creator	Yes	Conceived six additional stories that are written but yet to be told in any format.
Star Wars Detours	Creator	Yes	39 episodes and 62 additional scripts were completed as of 2013. Release cancelled.
Star Wars: Underworld	Creator	Yes	Live action TV series, many scripts are complete. Unproduced.

== Acting credits ==
=== Full-length films ===
Title	Year	Role	Notes
American Graffiti	1973	Pinkie’s Pizza Employee	Voice; Uncredited
Star Wars	1977	Holographic monster with a chessboard	Uncredited
Indiana Jones and the Temple of Doom	1984	Missionary	Uncredited
Hook	1991	Man Kissing Woman on Bridge	Uncredited
Beverly Hills Cop III	1994	Disappointed Husband	
Men in Black	1997	Alien on TV Monitor	Uncredited
Star Wars: Episode III – Revenge of the Sith	2005	Baron Papanoida	Uncredited
Minions & Monsters	2026	Himself	Voice

=== Short films ===
Title	Year	Role	Notes
Tion	1962	Urknown	
The Emperor	1967	Army Captaine	Documentary
Filmmaker	1968	Himself	Voice, documentary
Citizen Steve	1987	Himself	Documentary
Holiday Harbor	2003	Himself	
Rollin' with Saget	2006	Himself	Music video by Jamie Kennedy & Stu Stone feat. Bob Saget

=== Television ===
Title	Year	Role	Notes
R2-D2: Beneath the Dome	2001	Himself	TV special short mockumentary
Just Shoot Me!	2003	Himself	Episode 'It's Raining Babies'
The O.C.	2005	Himself	Episode 'The O.Sea'
Robot Chicken: Star Wars	2007	Himself	Voice, TV special short

== Uncredited production roles ==
Lucas has worked as an otherwise executive producer or creative capacity on several films and television series where he was not credited.

The list may not be complete.

=== Feature films ===
Title	Year	Notes
Body Heat	1981	
Return to Oz	1985	"Special thanks" credit only
Latino	1985	Lucasfilm production (George Lucas didn't credit as "Executive producer")
Powaqqatsi	1988	Documentary film / Credited as "Presentation" only, but not on the list of producers in final credits
Dreams	1990	Uncredited supervisor of post-production
Jurassic Park	1993	"Special thanks" credit, uncredited supervisor of post-production

=== Short films and attractions ===
Title	Year	Role	Notes
Bald: The Making of THX 1138	1971	Director	Documentary promo
Return of the Ewok	1982	Lucasfilm production	Mockumentary
"Lapti Nek": The Music Video from Jabba's Palace	1983	Lucasfilm production	Music video promo
The Adventures of André & Wally B.	1984	Lucasfilm Computer Graphics Project production	
Indiana Jones Epic Stunt Spectacular!	1989	Lucasfilm production	Attraction
The Great Movie Ride	1989	Lucasfilm licensed	Attraction
THX Wow!	1990	Executive producer	Video THX test
Rush Rush	1991	Lucasfilm Commercial productions	Music video by Paula Abdul
Change (American version)	1991	Lucasfilm Commercial productions	Music video by Lisa Stansfield
You Said, You Said	1991	Lucasfilm Commercial productions	Music video by Jermaine Jackson
Vibeology	1991	Lucasfilm Commercial productions	Music video by Paula Abdul
Giving Him Something He Can Feel	1992	Lucasfilm Commercial productions	Music video by En Vogue
The Indiana Jones et le Temple du Péril	1993	Lucasfilm production	Attractions
Extraterrorestrial Alien Encounter	1994	Lucasfilm production	Attractions
Indiana Jones Adventure	1995	Lucasfilm production	Attractions
Duel of the Fates	1999	Director	Music video promo
Star Wars Episode II: The Saga Continues	2000	Director, producer	Video documentary promo
Indiana Jones Adventure: Temple of the Crystal Skull	2001	Lucasfilm production	Attraction

Also many documentary features about Lucasfilm films from Internet, VHS, DVD and Blu-ray.

=== Television films and series ===
Title	Year(s)	Roles	Notes
The Making of Star Wars	1977	Association production (with The Star Wars Corporation)	Television documentary film
The Star Wars Holiday Special	1978	Executive producer / Conceived story idea / Writer (segment "Story of the Faithful Wookiee")	Television film
SP FX: The Empire Strikes Back	1980	Lucasfilm production	Television documentary films
The Making of Raiders of the Lost Ark	1981	Lucasfilm production	Television documentary films
Great Movie Stunts: Raiders of the Lost Ark	1981	Lucasfilm production	Television documentary films
Classic Creatures: Return of the Jedi	1983	Lucasfilm production	Television documentary films
From Star Wars to Jedi: The Making of a Saga	1983	Lucasfilm production	Television documentary films
Heroes and Sidekicks: Indiana Jones and the Temple of Doom	1984	Lucasfilm production	Television documentary films
The Making of Indiana Jones and the Temple of Doom	1985	Lucasfilm production	Television documentary films
Ewoks	1985–1986	Executive producer (production association with Nelvana)	26 episodes
Star Wars: Droids – The Adventures of R2-D2 and C-3PO	1985–1986	Executive producer (production association with Nelvana)	13 episodes + 1 Special
The Making of Captain Eo	1986	Lucasfilm production	Television documentary film
Maniac Mansion	1990–1993	Lucasfilm production	66 episodes
Defenders of Dynatron City	1992	Association production (with DIC Entertainment)	Unsold pilot
R2-D2: Beneath the Dome	2001	Lucasfilm production	Television mockumentary special
LEGO Star Wars: The Han Solo Affair	2002	Uncredited Lucasfilm production	Television short
Star Wars: Clone Wars	2003–2005	Executive producer	25 episodes
Empire of Dreams: The Story of the Star Wars Trilogy	2004	Association production (with Prometheus Entertainment)	Television documentary film
Star Wars: A Musical Journey	2005	Lucasfilm production	DVD anthology of music
Science of Star Wars	2005	Association production (with Evergreen Films)	Television documentary series, 3 episodes
Lego Star Wars: Revenge of the Brick	2005	Uncredited Lucasfilm production	Television short
Star Wars: The Legacy Revealed	2007	Lucasfilm production	Television documentary film
Star Wars Tech	2007	Lucasfilm as distributor	Television documentary film
Robot Chicken: Star Wars	2007	Association production (with Sony Pictures Digital)	Television special
Lego Indiana Jones and the Raiders of the Lost Brick	2008	Uncredited Lucasfilm production	Television short
Robot Chicken: Star Wars Episode II	2008	Lucasfilm production	Television special
LEGO Star Wars: Animated Comics	2008–2013	Uncredited Lucasfilm production	Web series
Lego Star Wars: The Quest for R2-D2	2009	Uncredited Lucasfilm production	Television short
Lego Star Wars: Bombad Bounty	2009	Uncredited Lucasfilm production	Television short
Robot Chicken: Star Wars Episode III	2010	Lucasfilm production	Television special
Lego Star Wars: The Padawan Menace	2011	Lucasfilm production	Television short
Lego Star Wars: The Empire Strikes Out	2012	Lucasfilm production	Television short
LEGO Star Wars: The Yoda Chronicles	2013	Lucasfilm production	Television series

Also many documentary videos and documentary web-series about Lucasfilm films from television, Internet, VHS, DVD and Blu-ray.

== Other contribution ==
In addition to any of his own involvement, Lucas has numerous "Based on characters created by", "Based on Star Wars created by", "Inspired by Star Wars created by", "Based on Indiana Jones created by", "Very Special Thanks" and "Special Thanks" credits in various films, television series, video games, books and comic books.

=== Feature films ===
Year	Title	Role	Notes
1965	The Bus	Production assistant	Documentary film
1966	Grand Prix	Additional camera operator	
1968	Finian's Rainbow	Production assistant	
1968	Journey to the Pacific	Assistant editor	Documentary film
1969	The Rain People	Production associate	
1969	Mackenna's Gold	Trainee	
1970	Gimme Shelter	Camera operator	Documentary film
1972	The Godfather	Assistant editor and second unit director	
1979	Apocalypse Now	Participated in early development of the film as writer and director before being replaced by Francis Ford Coppola, later helped financing late in production	
1981	Dragonslayer	Participated in making of the film	
1985	Ran	Participated in the financing of the film	
1989	Little Nemo: Adventures In Slumberland	Participated in making of the film	
2015	Star Wars: The Force Awakens	Wrote rough story treatment, creative consultant early in development	
2016	Rogue One	Creative consultant in development and visited set	
2017	Star Wars: The Last Jedi	Wrote rough story treatment, creative consultant in development	
2018	Solo: A Star Wars Story	Conceived original concept for the film, creative consultant early in development, visited set and assisted in directing one scene for Ron Howard	
2019	Star Wars: The Rise of Skywalker	Wrote rough story treatment, creative consultant in development	

=== Short films ===
Year	Title	Role	Notes
1964	The Soldier	Assistant cameraman	
1964	Orgy Beach Party	Still photographer	
1965	Wipeout	Participated in making of the film	
1966	Glut	Sound editor	
1966	Marcello, I'm So Bored	Sound editor	
1968	Why Man Creates	Camera operator	Documentary film
1980	Black Angel	Lucas mentored the director during the film's production and also included a screening of the film in the theatrical release The Empire Strikes Back in several territories.	
2013	Nuclear Waste: Fission Products & Transuranics from Thorium & Uranium	Lucas was unintentionally filmed during production.	Documentary film

=== Television series ===
Year	Title	Role
2019	Game of Thrones	Assisted director during production of first episode of the eighth and final season
2019–2020	The Mandalorian	Visited set during season 1 and season 2

=== Video games ===
Year	Title	Role
2007	The Adventures of Young Indiana Jones: Revolution	Participated in making
2007	The Adventures of Young Indiana Jones: Special Delivery	Participated in making
2008	The Adventures of Young Indiana Jones: Hunting for Treasure	Participated in making
2008	Star Wars: The Force Unleashed	Participated in making
2009	Indiana Jones and the Staff of Kings	Participated in making
2024	Indiana Jones and the Great Circle	Participated in making

=== Novel ===
Year	Title	Role
2012	Star Wars: Darth Plagueis	Participated in making during earliest stages

=== Comic book ===
Year	Title	Credits
2013–2014	The Star Wars	Eight issue comic adaptation of unproduced early screenplay for Star Wars; Written by J.W. Rinzler

== Re-releases ==
Year	Title	Role
1997	Star Wars: Episode IV - A New Hope	Executive producer, director
1997	Star Wars: Episode V - The Empire Strikes Back	Executive producer, director
1997	Star Wars: Episode VI - Return of the Jedi	Executive producer, director
1998	American Graffiti DVD	Supervisor
2004	THX 1138 - The George Lucas Director's Cut	Executive producer, director
2004	Star Wars: Episode IV - A New Hope DVD	Executive producer, director
2004	Star Wars: Episode V - The Empire Strikes Back DVD	Executive producer, director
2004	Star Wars: Episode VI - Return of the Jedi DVD	Executive producer, director
2007–2008	The Adventures of Young Indiana Jones DVDs	Executive producer
2011	American Graffiti Digitally remastered	Supervisor
2011	Star Wars - The Complete Saga Blu-ray	Executive producer
2012	Star Wars: Episode I - The Phantom Menace 3D	Supervisor
2012	Indiana Jones The Complete Adventures Digitally remastered	Supervisor
2013	Willow Digitally remastered	Supervisor
2013	Star Wars: Episode II - Attack of the Clones 3D	Supervisor
2015	Star Wars: Episode III - Revenge of the Sith 3D	Supervisor
2019	Star Wars: Episode IV - A New Hope 4K remaster	Supervisor
2019	Star Wars: Episode V - The Empire Strikes Back 4K remaster	Supervisor
2019	Star Wars: Episode VI - Return of the Jedi 4K remaster	Supervisor
2024	Willow 4K remaster	Supervisor
