= 21-87 =

1963 Canadian abstract montage-collage film by Arthur Lipsett

- Directed by: Arthur Lipsett
- Produced by: Colin Low; Tom Daly
- Edited by: Arthur Lipsett
- Distributed by: National Film Board of Canada
- Release date: 1963
- Running time: 9 minutes 33 seconds
- Country: Canada
- Language: English

21-87 is a 1963 Canadian abstract montage-collage film created by Arthur Lipsett that lasts 9 minutes and 33 seconds. The short, produced by the National Film Board of Canada, is a collage of snippets from discarded footage found by Lipsett in the editing room of the National Film Board (where he was employed as an animator), combined with his own black and white 16 mm footage which he shot on the streets of Montreal and New York City, among other locations.

== Release and reception ==
21-87 premiered on the CBC program Explorations in 1964.

Journalist Howard Junker dismisses 21-87 and Lipsett's other film, Free Fall, as repetitious: "the whole idea of wildly flashing stills and phrases wears quickly". Critic N. Roy Clifton is frustrated by the seeming randomness of the images. Critic John Fell suggests the film is evocative of parataxis, like a sentence without a conjunctive word.

== Influence on George Lucas ==
"21-87" would have a profound influence on director George Lucas and on Walter Murch, an editor and designer with whom Lucas worked. Lucas described it as "the kind of movie I wanted to make – a very off the wall, abstract kind of film".

In response, Lucas created the pure cinema, short, 16mm movies: "6-18-67", "1:42.08", and "Look at Life". The later "Electronic Labyrinth: THX 1138 4EB", an experimental science fiction short, takes place in a dystopian future on 14 May 2187. Lucas expanded the latter into THX 1138. His later works American Graffiti and Star Wars have shown "21-87"'s influence. Lucas and Lipsett would never meet.

The concept of the Force, so prominent in Star Wars and its sequels and prequels, is said to have been inspired by a statement made by Roman Kroitor in the short film.

=== References in Lucas's works and Star Wars ===
- In Star Wars, (Note: Originally titled Star Wars, the film was later retitled Star Wars: Episode IV—A New Hope.) Princess Leia's prison cell on the Death Star is numbered 2187.
- In the post Lucas era Star Wars sequel trilogy, FN-2187 is the designation of one of the main characters, who is later renamed Finn.
- In Star Wars: Republic Commando, in one mission the commando "Scorch" is being held in "Cell 2187".

The film is now shown at the Slavko Vorkapich Theater in the Lucas Museum of Narrative Art, a museum founded by Lucas .

== Awards ==
- Ann Arbor Film Festival, Ann Arbor, Michigan: First Prize, 1964
- Palo Alto Filmmakers' Festival, Palo Alto: Second Prize, 1964
- Midwest Film Festival, University of Chicago, Chicago: Most Popular Film, 1964
