= Anyone lived in a pretty how town =

Poem

"anyone lived in a pretty how town" is a poem written by E. E. Cummings. First published in 1940, the poem details the lives of residents in a nameless town. Like much of Cummings's work, the poem is actually untitled, so critics use the first line to refer to the poem. Cummings often wrote in a manner that did not follow standard English syntax and punctuation. This style is evident in the poem's first line, which is written in all lowercase letters and contains the unlikely phrase "pretty how town".

The poem inspired a short film of the same name by George Lucas.

== Style ==
The poem is organized into quatrains, with four beats (though a varying number of syllables) per line.

The poem's opening line uses the word how in a place that would typically be filled by an adjective. The next line ("with up so floating many bells down") is an example of hypallage, the interchange of the syntactic relationship between terms.

In the poem, Cummings states the lines, "spring summer autumn winter", (3) and "sun moon stars rain", (8) multiple times. In reiterating these lines he changes the order of the seasons, "autumn winter spring summer", (11) and "stars rain sun moon", (21).
