= Marcia Lucas =

American film editor (1945–2026)

- Lucas in 1978
- Born: Marcia Lou Griffin; October 4, 1945; Modesto, California, U.S.
- Died: May 27, 2026 (aged 80); Rancho Mirage, California, U.S.
- Other name: Marcia Lucas Rodrigues
- Occupation: Film editor
- Years active: 1968–1983; 1996–1998
- Known for: Star Wars
- Spouses: George Lucas (m. 1969; div. 1983) Tom Rodrigues (m. 1983; div. 1993)
- Children: 2, including Amanda

Marcia Lou Lucas (née Griffin; October 4, 1945 – May 27, 2026) was an American film editor. She is best known for her work editing Star Wars (1977) and Return of the Jedi (1983), as well as other films by her then-husband George Lucas: THX 1138 (1971) and American Graffiti (1973). She also edited Martin Scorsese's Alice Doesn't Live Here Anymore (1974), Taxi Driver (1976), and New York, New York (1977).

Lucas won the Academy Award for Best Film Editing for Star Wars. She was previously nominated for an Academy Award for her film editing on American Graffiti and for a BAFTA Award for Best Editing for Taxi Driver. After a career gap while raising her family, Lucas produced two films in the 1990s.

== Early life ==
Marcia Lou Griffin was born in Modesto, California on October 4, 1945. Her father was an Air Force officer stationed in Stockton, California during World War II. Her parents divorced when she was two. Her mother, Mae Griffin, relocated the family to North Hollywood, California, to live with her parents. When Marcia's grandfather died, her mother moved to an apartment nearby, and she found work as a clerk at an insurance agency.

When Marcia was a teenager, her father reentered her life, but he had remarried and was stationed in Florida. Marcia lived with her stepfamily for two years and then moved back to Hollywood. She returned to North Hollywood to finish high school and enrolled in chemistry courses at Los Angeles City College while working in a mortgage-banking firm.

== Career ==
=== 1964–1968: Early work ===
In 1964, Marcia's then-boyfriend worked for a Hollywood museum and wanted to hire her as a librarian to catalog all the donated movie memorabilia. They sent her to apply for the job at a California State Employment office. Since she had no experience, the Employment office sent her to Sandler Films as they needed an apprentice film librarian with no experience. By the time she was twenty, Marcia was promoted to an assistant editor. She was accepted into the Motion Picture Editors Guild (MPEG) apprenticeship of eight years, leading to becoming a Guild film editor. At Sandler Films, she edited promotional films and trailers.

In 1967, Verna Fields, one of the few respected female film editors in the industry at that time, asked Sandler Films to send her an assistant editor to help on a United States Information Agency (USIA) documentary about U.S. President Lyndon B. Johnson's December 21–23, 1967 Southeast Asia trip, later titled Journey to the Pacific (1968). Fields had also hired University of Southern California (USC) students as assistant editors, including George Lucas. The following spring, the newly engaged Marcia moved in with Lucas at his hilltop apartment on Portola Drive in Beverly Hills while George directed his final student film, Electronic Labyrinth: THX 1138 4EB (1967).

In February 1968, as Marcia returned to edit commercials, George accompanied Francis Ford Coppola to scout filming locations for The Rain People (1968) in Long Island, New York. While Coppola was filming, George decided to make a small, intimate cinéma vérité documentary about the making of Coppola's film. He pitched the idea of a documentary to Coppola, who gave him the go-ahead, with the film allocated from the still photography budget.

=== 1969–1976: Feature film editing ===
Back in California, Marcia had accepted an offer to work on Medium Cool (1969) when George recommended her as an assistant editor for Barry Malkin on The Rain People. Fortunately, Medium Cool was delayed, which allowed her to work on both films. When The Rain People had wrapped, Lucas returned to their Portola Drive residence, where he and Marcia assembled the footage for the documentary Filmmaker (1968).

Shortly after, Coppola had established a multi-picture deal with his production company American Zoetrope and Warner Bros. Their first project was THX 1138 (1971) for which Marcia served as an assistant editor. Reflecting on the film's commercial failure, Marcia stated: "I never cared for THX because it left me cold. When the studio didn't like the film, I wasn't surprised. But George just said to me I was stupid and knew nothing. Because I was just a Valley Girl. He was the intellectual."

When American Graffiti (1973) finished filming, George had wanted Marcia to edit the film. However, Universal Pictures executive Ned Tanen insisted on hiring Verna Fields, who had just finished editing Steven Spielberg's The Sugarland Express (1974). Fields worked on the rough cut for American Graffiti and then left to resume editing What's Up, Doc? (1972). For the next six months, Marcia edited American Graffiti, alongside her husband and sound editor Walter Murch to its contractual runtime of 110 minutes. In 1974, Marcia Lucas and Fields were nominated for the Academy Award for Best Film Editing for American Graffiti.

After American Graffiti was released, Martin Scorsese asked Marcia to edit Alice Doesn't Live Here Anymore (1974), his first studio film. Sandra Weintraub recalled: "We knew her, and we liked her, and she was in the union. It was good for her to get away from George and his house. Here she was, a wonderful editor working on her husband's films. I don't think she got taken seriously." As Marcia was editing the film in Los Angeles, George joined her and sequestered himself in a hotel room as he wrote the first draft for Star Wars (1977). In his fourth draft of Star Wars, George originally had written for Obi-Wan Kenobi to survive his lightsaber duel with Darth Vader by retreating through a blast door that would slam shut behind him. Marcia suggested to her husband that he should kill off Kenobi and have him act as a spiritual guide to Luke, which George was already considering.

=== 1976–1977: Star Wars ===
Before Star Wars entered post-production, Marcia was not considered to edit the film as she expected to give birth after editing Taxi Driver (1976). However, the pregnancy was unsuccessful. George's first choice was Richard Chew—who had edited The Conversation (1974) and One Flew Over the Cuckoo's Nest (1975). However, Chew's salary was too expensive, and he was tired from his last editing job. Instead, George hired British union editor John Jympson, who had edited A Hard Day's Night (1964). Lucas had hoped Jympson would bring a similar cinéma vérité style to Star Wars.

As the production was filming in Tunisia, the dailies were delivered to Jympson, who began editing the scenes. It was not until May 1976 that George reviewed the dailies and was left unimpressed. By June 1976, still unsatisfied with Jympson's dailies, George was forced to send them to Los Angeles for Alan Ladd Jr. and Fox executives to review. Halfway through production, by mid-June, George fired Jympson, to which he recalled: "In the end, I don't think he fully understood the movie and what I was trying to do. I shoot in a very peculiar way, in a documentary style, and it takes a lot of hard editing to make that work."

"I know for a fact that Marcia Lucas was responsible for convincing [George Lucas] to keep that little "kiss for luck" before Carrie [Fisher] and I swing across the chasm in the first film: 'Oh, I don't like it, people laugh in the previews,' and she said, 'George, they're laughing because it's so sweet and unexpected'--and her influence was such that if she wanted to keep it, it was in.

When the little mouse robot comes up when Harrison and I are delivering Chewbacca to the prison and he roars at it and it screams, sort of, and runs away, George wanted to cut that and Marcia insisted that he keep it. She was really the warmth and the heart of those films, a good person he could talk to, bounce ideas off of, who would tell him when he was wrong."

— Mark Hamill, 2005

To replace Jympson, George hired Marcia as the new film editor. For the visual effects studio Industrial Light & Magic (ILM), their first task was to assemble the required special effects shots for the Battle of Yavin sequence. George assigned Marcia the task of editing the sequence so ILM could start. Lucas had explicitly described the sequence through fifty pages of his script. In an interview with Rolling Stone, George estimated that "it took her eight weeks to cut that battle. It was extremely complex, and we had 40,000 feet of dialogue footage of pilots saying this and that. And she had to cull through all that, and put in all the fighting as well."

As Marcia edited the Death Star assault, Lucas hired a second editor, Richard Chew—his first choice—to help restructure the rough cut. Chew concentrated on reassembling the first hour of the film before he edited the dogfight after the characters escaped the Death Star. As Lucas wanted a rough cut by Thanksgiving 1976, and with the workload becoming too cumbersome, Lucas hired editor Paul Hirsch at Brian De Palma's suggestion. At the time, Hirsch had just finished editing De Palma's Carrie (1976). Throughout the autumn of 1976, George supervised the editors at Parkhouse in San Anselmo, where he gave suggestive notes of what he wanted done.

Around Thanksgiving of 1976, Marcia left Star Wars to work on Scorsese's musical drama New York, New York (1977). Another account states Marcia left to edit New York, New York near Christmas because Irving Lerner had died before he finished editing the film.

In late February 1977, George screened a rough cut of Star Wars for Ladd, several Fox executives, and several of his close friends, Matthew Robbins, Hal Barwood, Willard Huyck and his wife Gloria Katz, Steven Spielberg, Brian De Palma, Jay Cocks, and John Milius. After the screening, Marcia—who had not seen the film since the first assembly cut—burst into tears, certain the film was a disaster. Although the sound mix was not complete, a test screening of Star Wars was held at the Northpoint Theatre in San Francisco, where American Graffiti had been test-screened four years earlier. On a break from editing New York, New York, Marcia attended the screening and warned George: "If the audience doesn't cheer when Han Solo comes in at the last second in the Millennium Falcon to help Luke when he's being chased by Darth Vader, the picture doesn't work."

At the 50th Academy Awards, Lucas won the 1977 Academy Award for Best Film Editing with Chew and Hirsch.

=== 1978–1996: Skywalker Ranch, Return of the Jedi ===
Following the success of Star Wars, Marcia placed her career on hold to raise a family. She told People magazine: "Getting our private life together and having a baby is the project for the rest of this year." In 1978, she helped with supervising the completion of the interior design and decoration of Skywalker Ranch. When George decided to base Lucasfilm in Marin County, he purchased a Lankershim Boulevard warehouse and renamed it the Egg Company. He wanted the Egg Company to be an ideal creative environment for filmmakers and businesspeople. George laid out the indoor courtyard with large, roomy offices, and Marcia designed the interior with dark green walls with burnished wood trim, antique desks and tables, and a polished oak balcony overlooking the courtyard. When The Empire Strikes Back (1980) wrapped its production, Lucas closed down the Egg Company.

After viewing the rough cut of Raiders of the Lost Ark (1981), Marcia stated that there was no emotional closure because Marion Ravenwood did not appear at the ending that was originally scripted. Duwayne Dunham recalled: "Everyone was feeling real good until she said that. It was one of those, 'Oh, no, we lost sight of that.'" As a result, Spielberg shot the final scene with her and Indiana Jones in downtown San Francisco.

In 1982, Marcia came on board Return of the Jedi (1983) as the film's third editor, alongside Dunham and Sean Barton. When asked about her contributions to the film, George described the scenes she helped edit as the emotional "dying and crying" scenes. Marcia's last film credit was as executive producer of 1996's No Easy Way.

== Personal life ==
In 1967, Marcia met George Lucas while he was attending film school at the University of Southern California when they both served as apprentice editors on Journey to the Pacific under Verna Fields. On February 22, 1969, they were married. They adopted one daughter, Amanda Lucas, who was born in 1981. Due to her husband's commitments with the Star Wars films and Raiders of the Lost Ark, Marcia grew impatient in her marriage as she blamed his workaholism and emotional blockage.

In mid-1982, Marcia asked for a divorce, but to maintain a positive public image, George asked her to wait until after Return of the Jedi was released to go public with the decision. On June 13, 1983, George formally announced at Skywalker Ranch that he and Marcia were divorcing; the couple would share custody of their daughter while Marcia would relocate to Los Angeles. When the divorce was finalized, she reportedly received $50 million from the settlement. However, she has since disputed this claim, stating in an interview with Nacelle Company that the actual payout was less than half that reported amount.

Marcia later married Tom Rodrigues, a stained glass artist who worked as a production manager at Skywalker Ranch from 1980 to 1983, whom she met before divorcing George. In 1985, the couple had a daughter, Amy Rodrigues. Lucas and Rodrigues divorced in 1993.

== Death ==
Marcia died from cancer at her vacation home in Rancho Mirage, California, on May 27, 2026 at the age of 80.

== Legacy ==
In an interview, Mark Hamill cited Marcia for her contributions to Star Wars. In the 1999 biography Mythmaker: The Life and Work of George Lucas, filmmaker John Milius described Marcia's contributions to Milius's own films and those of George Lucas, Steven Spielberg, and Martin Scorsese, calling her one of the best editors he knew.

In 2021, SFGate published an article calling Marcia the "secret weapon of Star Wars", further stating that: "Considering the reaction to the Star Wars prequels and George's distance from the franchise now, it's not a stretch to say that Marcia was actually the glue that kept the galaxy far, far away together. Or, at the very least, helped repair it when it needed to be fixed." Some have called George the "head" of Star Wars and Marcia the "heart," though Marcia commented: "I wouldn't think so. I definitely made scenes work. I made the end battle work, I definitely had a lot to do with making it work, but I wasn't the writer and I wasn't the director, and I didn't come up with the creative names, Darth Vader, Luke Skywalker. All those names are classics. George came up with all of it using his amazing imagination."

In J. W. Rinzler's posthumous final book, Howard Kazanjian: A Producer's Life, Lucas criticized the later Star Wars films. She revealed that upon seeing The Phantom Menace, she "cried because [she] didn't think it was very good," particularly criticizing the age gap between romantic leads Anakin Skywalker and Padmé Amidala. About the sequel trilogy, she stated that Kathleen Kennedy and J. J. Abrams "don't get it," saying that she was furious at the deaths of Han Solo and Luke Skywalker, as well as the lack of an explanation for Rey's powers.

== Filmography ==
Year	Film	Editor	Director	Notes
1968	Filmmaker	Uncredited	George Lucas	Documentary short film
1968	The New Cinema	Assist.	Gary Young	Television documentary film
1969	The Rain People	Assist.	Francis Ford Coppola	
1969	Medium Cool	Assist.	Haskell Wexler	
1971	THX 1138	Assist.	George Lucas	
1972	The Candidate	Assist.	Michael Ritchie	
1973	American Graffiti	Yes	George Lucas	
1974	Alice Doesn't Live Here Anymore	Yes	Martin Scorsese	
1976	Taxi Driver	Supervising	Martin Scorsese	
1977	New York, New York	Supervising	Martin Scorsese	
1977	Star Wars	Yes	George Lucas	
1979	More American Graffiti	Uncredited	Bill L. Norton	
1983	Return of the Jedi	Yes	Richard Marquand	

Work as a producer

- No Easy Way (1996) - executive producer
- A Good Son (1998) - producer; short film

Special thanks credit for

- More American Graffiti (1979)
- The Making of 'Raiders of the Lost Ark' (1981, television documentary film)
- Twice Upon a Time (1983, ''extra special thanks'')
- A Good Son (1998, short; ''made possible by a grant from'')

== Awards and nominations ==
Year	Award	Category	Title	Results	Ref.
1973	Academy Award	Best Film Editing	American Graffiti	Nominated	
1976	British Academy Film Award	Best Editing	Taxi Driver	Nominated	
1977	Academy Award	Best Film Editing	Star Wars	Won	
1977	BAFTA Award	Best Editing	Star Wars	Nominated	
1977	Saturn Award	Best Editing	Star Wars	Won	

== Sources ==
- Baxter, John (1999). Mythmaker: The Life and Work of George Lucas. New York City: Spike Books. ISBN 0-380-97833-4.
- Biskind, Peter (1998). Easy Riders, Raging Bulls: How the Sex-Drugs-and Rock 'n Roll Generation Saved Hollywood. Simon & Schuster. ISBN 978-0-684-80996-0. OCLC 38389788.
  - Easy Riders, Raging Bulls
- Hirsch, Paul (2019). A Long Time Ago in a Cutting Room Far, Far Away: My Fifty Years Editing Hollywood Hits—Star Wars, Carrie, Ferris Bueller's Day Off, Mission: Impossible, and More. Chicago Review Press. ISBN 978-1-64160-258-7.
- Jones, Brian Jay (2016). George Lucas: A Life. Little, Brown and Company. ISBN 978-0316257428. OCLC 946216508.
- Kaminski, Michael (2008). The Secret History of Star Wars: The Art of Storytelling and the Making of a Modern Epic. Kingston, Ontario: Legacy Books Press. ISBN 978-0-978-46523-0. OCLC 313441965.
  - "Excerpt of the first 100 pages" (PDF). Archived from the original (PDF) on October 29, 2019.
- Rinzler, J. W. (2007). The Making of Star Wars: The Definitive Story Behind the Original Film. Ebury. ISBN 978-0-09-192014-2.
- Rinzler, J. W. (2019). Howard Kazanjian: A Producer's Life. Abrams. ISBN 978-1-64700-661-7.
- Pollock, Dale (1983). Skywalking: The Life and Films of George Lucas. New York City: Da Capo Press. ISBN 978-0-306-80904-0. OCLC 237354028.
