= Filmmaker (disambiguation) =

Filmmaker refers to a person involved in filmmaking.

Filmmaker may also refer to:

- Film director, person who controls the artistic and dramatic aspects of a film production
- Filmmaker (film), a 1968 documentary film by George Lucas
- Filmmaker (magazine), a quarterly publication magazine covering issues relating to independent film

== See also ==
- Film producer
- Film director
