= List of awards and nominations received by George Lucas =

George Lucas awards and nominations
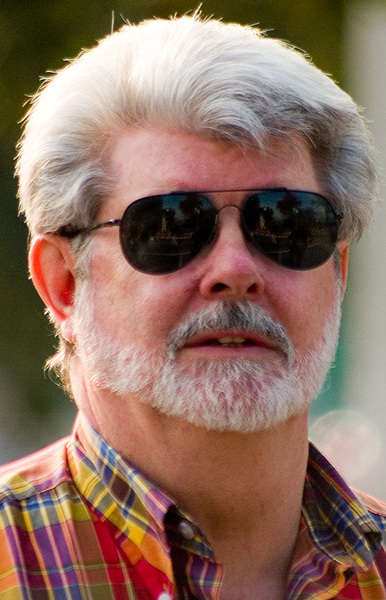
Awards and nominations
| Award | Wins | Nominations |
| Academy Awards | 0 | 4 |
| Emmy Awards | 2 | 5 |
| Golden Globe Awards | 0 | 2 |

The following is a list of awards and nominations received by George Lucas.

== Major associations ==
=== Academy Awards ===
| Year | Category | Nominated work | Result | Ref. |
|---|---|---|---|---|
| 1973 | Best Director | American Graffiti | Nominated | |
| 1973 | Best Original Screenplay | American Graffiti | Nominated | |
| 1977 | Best Director | Star Wars | Nominated | |
| 1977 | Best Original Screenplay | Star Wars | Nominated | |
| 1992 | Irving G. Thalberg Award | | Received | |

=== Cannes Film Festival ===
| Year | Category | Nominated work | Result | Ref. |
|---|---|---|---|---|
| 1971 | FIBRESCI | THX 1138 | Nominated | |
| 2005 | Festival Trophy | | Received | |
| 2024 | Honorary Palme d'Or | | Received | |

=== BAFTA Awards ===
| Year | Category | Nominated work | Result | Ref. |
Britannia Awards
| 2002 | Excellence in Film Award | | Received | |

=== Golden Globe Awards ===
| Year | Category | Nominated work | Result | Ref. |
|---|---|---|---|---|
| 1973 | Best Director | American Graffiti | Nominated | |
| 1977 | Best Director | Star Wars | Nominated | |

=== Emmy Awards ===
| Year | Category | Nominated work | Result | Ref. |
Primetime Emmy Awards
| 1985 | Outstanding Children's Program | The Ewok Adventure | Nominated | |
| 1986 | Outstanding Children's Program | Ewoks: The Battle for Endor | Nominated | |
Daytime Emmy Awards
| 2013 | Outstanding Special Class Animated Program | Star Wars: The Clone Wars | Won | |
| 2014 | Outstanding Special Class Animated Program | Star Wars: The Clone Wars | Won | |
| 2015 | Outstanding Special Class Animated Program | Star Wars: The Clone Wars | Nominated | |

== Guild awards ==
=== Directors Guild of America Awards ===
| Year | Category | Nominated work | Result | Ref. |
|---|---|---|---|---|
| 1973 | Outstanding Directorial Achievement - Motion Pictures | American Graffiti | Nominated | |
| 1977 | Outstanding Directorial Achievement - Motion Pictures | Star Wars | Nominated | |

=== Producers Guild of America Awards ===
| Year | Category | Nominated work | Result | Ref. |
|---|---|---|---|---|
| 2003 | Vanguard Award | | Received | |
| 2022 | Milestone Award | | Received | |

=== Writers Guild of America Awards ===
| Year | Category | Nominated work | Result | Ref. |
|---|---|---|---|---|
| 1973 | Best Original Screenplay | American Graffiti | Nominated | |
| 1977 | Best Original Screenplay | Star Wars | Nominated | |
| 1981 | Best Original Screenplay | Raiders of the Lost Ark | Nominated | |

== Miscellaneous awards ==
=== Empire Awards ===
| Year | Category | Nominated work | Result | Ref. |
|---|---|---|---|---|
| 2005 | Best Film | Star Wars: Episode III – Revenge of the Sith | Nominated | |
| 2005 | Best Sci-Fi/Fantasy | Star Wars: Episode III – Revenge of the Sith | Won | |

=== Evening Standard Film Awards ===
| Year | Category | Nominated work | Result | Ref. |
|---|---|---|---|---|
| 1977 | Best Film (The Best One in the Year) | Star Wars | Won | |

=== Hugo Awards ===
| Year | Category | Nominated work | Result | Ref. |
|---|---|---|---|---|
| 1980 | Best Dramatic Presentation | Empire Strikes Back | Won | |
| 1983 | Best Dramatic Presentation | Return of the Jedi | Won | |
| 1990 | Best Dramatic Presentation | Indiana Jones and the Last Crusade | Won | |

=== Saturn Awards ===
| Year | Category | Nominated work | Result | Ref. |
|---|---|---|---|---|
| 1978 | Best Director | Star Wars | Won | |
| 1978 | Best Writing | Star Wars | Won | |
| 1984 | Best Writing | Return of the Jedi | Nominated | |
| 2000 | Best Director | Star Wars Episode I: The Phantom Menace | Nominated | |
| 2003 | Best Director | Star Wars Episode II: Attack of the Clones | Nominated | |
| 2006 | Best Director | Star Wars Episode III: Revenge of the Sith | Nominated | |
| 2006 | Best Writing | Star Wars Episode III: Revenge of the Sith | Nominated | |

== Other awards ==
| Year | Award | Category | Film | Result |
|---|---|---|---|---|
| 1988 | Golden Raspberry Award | Worst Screenplay | Willow | Nominated |
| 1999 | Golden Raspberry Award | Worst Picture | Star Wars: Episode I – The Phantom Menace | Nominated |
| 1999 | Golden Raspberry Award | Worst Director | Star Wars: Episode I – The Phantom Menace | Nominated |
| 1999 | Golden Raspberry Award | Worst Screenplay | Star Wars: Episode I – The Phantom Menace | Nominated |
| 2002 | Golden Raspberry Award | Worst Director | Star Wars: Episode II – Attack of the Clones | Nominated |
| 2002 | Golden Raspberry Award | Worst Picture (Shared with Rick McCallum) | Star Wars: Episode II – Attack of the Clones | Nominated |
| 2002 | Golden Raspberry Award | Worst Screenplay | Star Wars: Episode II – Attack of the Clones | Won |

== Awards and nominations received by Lucas' directed features ==
| Year | Film Title | Academy Awards | | BAFTAs | | Golden Globes | | Saturn Awards | |
| Year | Film Title | Nominations | Wins | Nominations | Wins | Nominations | Wins | Nominations | Wins |
|---|---|---|---|---|---|---|---|---|---|
| 1973 | American Graffiti | 5 | | 1 | | 4 | 2 | | |
| 1977 | Star Wars: Episode IV - A New Hope | 10 | 6 | 6 | 2 | 4 | 1 | 12 | 8 |
| 1999 | Star Wars: Episode I - The Phantom Menace | 3 | | 2 | | | | 10 | 2 |
| 2002 | Star Wars: Episode II - Attack of the Clones | 1 | | | | | | 7 | 2 |
| 2005 | Star Wars: Episode III - Revenge of the Sith | 1 | | | | | | 10 | 2 |
| Total | | 20 | 6 | 9 | 2 | 8 | 3 | 39 | 14 |
