= Anyone Lived in a Pretty How Town (film) =

1967 film by George Lucas

- Directed by: George Lucas
- Written by: George Lucas; Paul Golding
- Based on: Anyone Lived in a Pretty How Town by E. E. Cummings
- Starring: John Strawbridge; Nancy Yates; Lance Larson
- Cinematography: Rick Robertson
- Edited by: Paul Golding
- Music by: Lynton B. Eckhart
- Distributed by: University of Southern California
- Release date: 1967
- Running time: 6 minutes
- Language: English

Anyone Lived in a Pretty How Town (stylized as anyone lived in a pretty [how] town) is a 1967 American short film made by George Lucas inspired by E. E. Cummings' poem of the same name.

It was one of two films Lucas made after returning to USC's film school as a graduate in 1967 (the other was The Emperor). The film represented a first for the USC film school by being shot in color and widescreen.

The film was shown out of competition in the Special Screening section at the Short Shorts Film Festival EXPO 2005.

== Premise ==
The film focuses on the life cycle of a townspeople, and a photographer who takes pictures of one ignored young couple.

== See also ==
- List of American films of 1967
