= George Lucas =

American filmmaker and entrepreneur (born 1944)

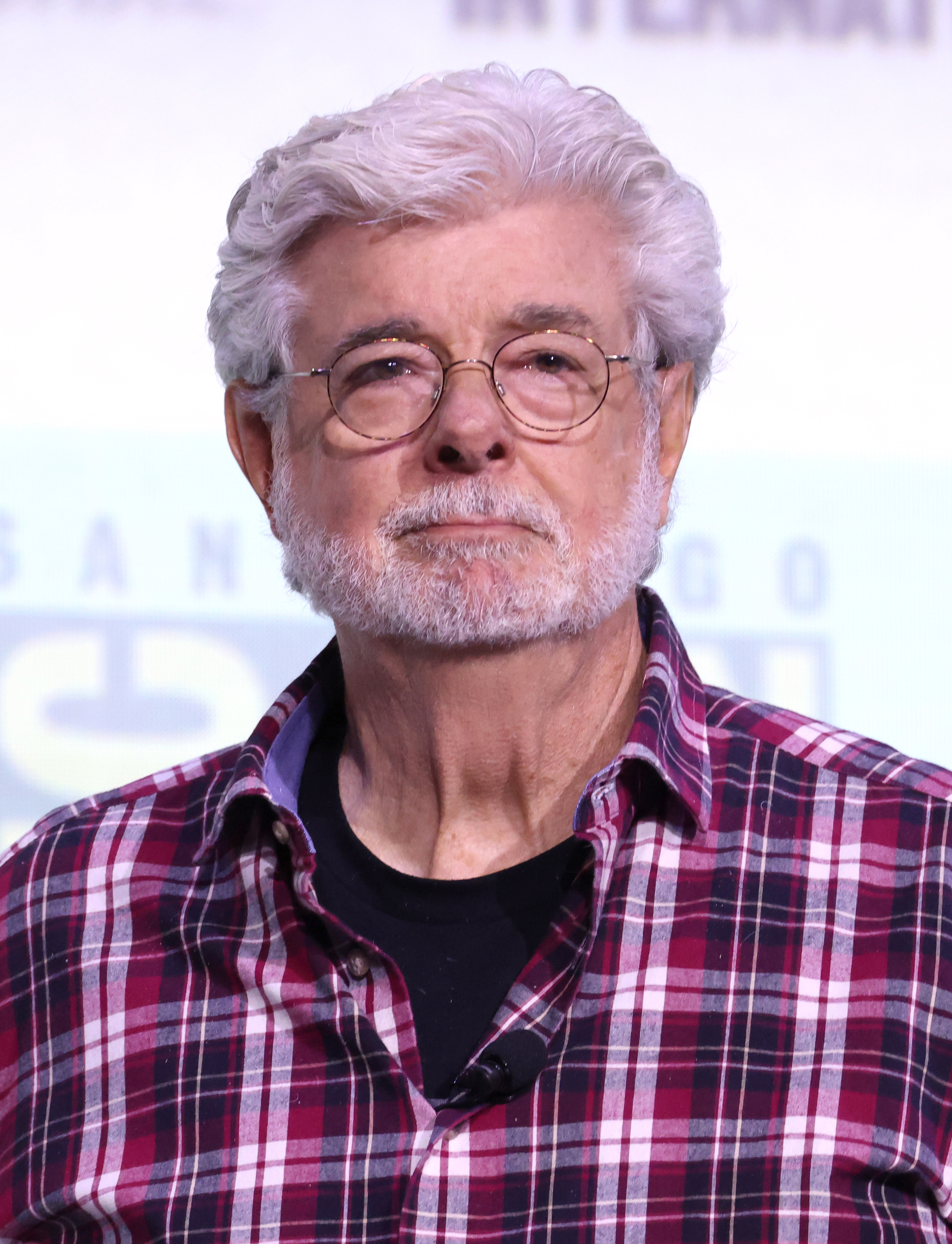
- Lucas at the 2025 San Diego Comic-Con
- Born: George Walton Lucas Jr. May 14, 1944 (age 82); Modesto, California, U.S.
- Education: Modesto Junior College; University of Southern California (BFA)
- Occupations: Film director; screenwriter; producer; philanthropist; entrepreneur
- Years active: 1965–present
- Works: Full list
- Title: Founder of Lucasfilm, LucasArts, Industrial Light & Magic, and THX
- Spouses: Marcia Griffin (m. 1969; div. 1983); Mellody Hobson (m. 2013)
- Children: 4, including Amanda and Katie
- Awards: Full list

George Walton Lucas Jr. (born May 14, 1944) is an American filmmaker, philanthropist, and entrepreneur. He created the Star Wars franchise and its fictional universe, the Indiana Jones franchise, and founded Lucasfilm, LucasArts, Industrial Light & Magic, and THX. Lucas also served as chairman of Lucasfilm before selling it to The Walt Disney Company in 2012. The recipient of two Emmy Awards and nominations for four Academy Awards and two Golden Globe Awards, he is considered to be one of the most significant figures of the 20th-century New Hollywood movement, and a pioneer of the modern blockbuster. Despite this, he has remained an independent filmmaker for most of his career.

After graduating from the University of Southern California in 1967, Lucas moved to San Francisco and co-founded American Zoetrope with filmmaker Francis Ford Coppola. He wrote and directed THX 1138 (1971), based on his student short Electronic Labyrinth: THX 1138 4EB, which was a critical success but a financial failure. His next work as a writer-director was American Graffiti (1973), inspired by his youth in early 1960s Modesto, California, and produced through the newly founded Lucasfilm. The film was critically and commercially successful and received five Academy Award nominations, including Best Director and Best Picture. Lucas's next film, the epic space opera Star Wars (1977), later retitled A New Hope, had a troubled production but was a surprise hit, becoming the highest-grossing film at the time, winning six Academy Awards and sparking a cultural phenomenon. Lucas produced and co-wrote the sequels The Empire Strikes Back (1980) and Return of the Jedi (1983). With director Steven Spielberg, he created, produced, and co-wrote Indiana Jones films Raiders of the Lost Ark (1981), The Temple of Doom (1984), The Last Crusade (1989) and The Kingdom of the Crystal Skull (2008), and served as an executive producer, with a cursory involvement in pre- and post-production, on The Dial of Destiny (2023).

In 1997, Lucas re-released the original Star Wars trilogy as part of a Special Edition featuring several modifications; home media versions with further changes were released in 2004 and 2011. He returned to directing with a Star Wars prequel trilogy comprising The Phantom Menace (1999), Attack of the Clones (2002) and Revenge of the Sith (2005). He last collaborated on the CGI-animated movie and television series of the same name, Star Wars: The Clone Wars (2008–2014, 2020), the war film Red Tails (2012) and the jukebox musical fantasy CGI-animated film Strange Magic (2015). Lucas is also known for his collaboration with composer John Williams, who was recommended to him by Spielberg, and with whom he has worked for all films in the Star Wars and Indiana Jones franchises. He also produced and wrote a variety of films and television series through Lucasfilm between the 1970s and the 2010s.

Lucas is one of history's most financially successful filmmakers. He directed or wrote the story for ten of the 100 highest-grossing movies at the North American box office, adjusted for ticket-price inflation. Through his companies Industrial Light and Magic and Skywalker Sound, Lucas was involved in the production of, and financially benefited from, almost every big-budget film released in the U.S. from the late 1980s until selling to Disney in 2012. In addition to his career as a filmmaker, Lucas has founded and supported multiple philanthropic organizations and campaigns dedicated to education and the arts, including the George Lucas Educational Foundation, which has been noted as a key supporter in the creation of the federal E-Rate program to provide broadband funding to schools and libraries, and the Lucas Museum of Narrative Art, an art museum in Los Angeles developed with his wife, Mellody Hobson.

== Early life and education ==
Lucas was born on May 14, 1944, in Modesto, California, a small agricultural city in the Central Valley. He is the son of Dorothy Ellinore Lucas (née Bomberger) and George Walton Lucas Sr., and is of German, Swiss German, English, Scottish, and distant Dutch and French descent. He grew up in Modesto, and his family attended Disneyland during its opening week in July 1955, and Lucas would remain enthusiastic about the park. He was interested in comics and science fiction, including television programs such as the Flash Gordon serials. Long before Lucas began making films, he yearned to be a racecar driver, and he spent most of his high school years racing on the underground circuit at fairgrounds and hanging out at garages. On June 12, 1962, a few days before his high school graduation, Lucas was driving his souped-up Autobianchi Bianchina when another driver broadsided him, (Note: Lucas was later ticketed for making an illegal left-hand turn.) flipping his car several times before it crashed into a tree; Lucas's seatbelt had snapped, ejecting him and thereby saving his life. However, his lungs were bruised from severe hemorrhaging and he required emergency medical treatment. This incident caused him to lose interest in racing as a career, but also inspired him to pursue his other interests.

Lucas's father owned a stationery store, and had wanted George to work for him when he turned 18. Lucas had been planning to go to art school, but his father said he would not pay for it. Lucas declared upon leaving home that he would be a millionaire by the age of 30. (Note: He became a millionaire at the age of 28 after selling American Graffiti to theaters.) He attended Modesto Junior College, where he studied anthropology, sociology, and literature, amongst other subjects. He also began shooting with an 8 mm camera, including filming car races. At this time, Lucas became interested in Canyon Cinema: screenings of underground, avant-garde 16 mm film-makers like Jordan Belson, Stan Brakhage and Bruce Conner. Lucas and childhood friend John Plummer also saw classic European films of the time, including Jean-Luc Godard's Breathless, François Truffaut's Jules et Jim and Federico Fellini's 8½. "That's when George really started exploring," Plummer said. Through his interest in autocross racing, Lucas met renowned cinematographer Haskell Wexler, another race enthusiast. Wexler, later to work with Lucas on several occasions, was impressed by Lucas's talent. "George had a very good eye, and he thought visually," he recalled.

At Plummer's recommendation, Lucas then transferred to the University of Southern California (U.S.C.) School of Cinematic Arts. U.S.C. was one of the earliest universities to have a school devoted to motion picture film. During the years at U.S.C., Lucas shared a dorm room with Randal Kleiser. Along with classmates such as Walter Murch, Caleb Deschanel, Hal Barwood, John Milius and Matthew Robbins, they became a clique of film students known as The Dirty Dozen. He also became good friends with fellow acclaimed student film-maker and future Indiana Jones collaborator, Steven Spielberg and Martin Scorsese. (Note: Spielberg attended a USC screening in early 1968 and met Lucas after being impressed by his Electronic Labyrinth: THX 1138 4EB.)

A group of friends, which included Chris Lewis and Don Glut, started the Clean Cut Cinema Club. Lucas, Kleiser and Lewis then formed a short-lived production company called Sunrise Productions with offices on Sunset Boulevard. There they would make up stage names for themselves, Lucas calling himself Lucas Beaumont. Their only project would be the never completed short "Five, Four, Three", a self-referential and self-deprecating mockumentary about the making of a satirical teen beach movie called "Orgy Beach Party".

Lucas was deeply influenced by the filmic expression course taught at the school by film-maker Lester Novros which concentrated on the non-narrative elements of film form like color, light, movement, space and time. Another inspiration was the Serbian montagist (and dean of the U.S.C. Film Department) Slavko Vorkapich, a film theoretician who made stunning montage sequences for Hollywood studio features at MGM, RKO, and Paramount. Vorkapich taught the autonomous nature of the cinematic art form, emphasizing the kinetic energy inherent in motion pictures.

After graduating with a bachelor of fine arts in film in 1967, he tried to join the United States Air Force as an officer, but he was immediately turned down because of his numerous speeding tickets. He was later drafted by the United States Army for military service in Vietnam, but he was exempted from service after medical tests showed he had diabetes, the disease that killed his paternal grandfather.

== Career ==
=== 1965–1969: Early career ===
Lucas saw many inspiring films in class, particularly the visual films coming out of the National Film Board of Canada like Arthur Lipsett's 21-87, cameraman Jean-Claude Labrecque's cinéma vérité 60 Cycles, the work of Norman McLaren and the documentaries of Claude Jutra. Lucas was enamored with pure cinema and quickly became prolific at making 16 mm nonstory noncharacter visual tone poems and cinéma vérité with such titles as Look at Life, Herbie, 1:42.08, The Emperor, Anyone Lived in a Pretty (how) Town, Filmmaker and 6-18-67. He was passionate and interested in cinematography and editing, defining himself as a film-maker as opposed to being a director, and he loved making abstract visual films that created emotions purely through nonnarrative structures.

In 1967, Lucas reenrolled as a U.S.C. graduate student in film production. He began working under movie and logo designer Saul Bass and film editor Verna Fields for the United States Information Agency, where he met his future wife Marcia Griffin. Working as an instructor for a class of U.S. Navy students who were being taught documentary cinematography, Lucas directed the short film Electronic Labyrinth: THX 1138 4EB, which won first prize at the 1967–68 National Student film festival. Lucas was awarded a student scholarship by Warner Bros. to observe and work on the making of a film of his choosing. The film he chose after finding the animation department closed down was Finian's Rainbow (1968) which was being directed by Francis Ford Coppola, who was revered among film school students of the time as a cinema graduate who had "made it" in Hollywood. In 1969, Lucas was one of the camera operators on the classic Rolling Stones concert film Gimme Shelter.

=== 1969–1977: THX 1138, American Graffiti, and Star Wars ===
In 1969, Lucas moved back to the San Francisco Bay Area and co-founded the studio American Zoetrope with Coppola, hoping to create a liberating environment for film-makers to direct outside the perceived oppressive control of the Hollywood studio system. Coppola thought Lucas's Electronic Labyrinth could be adapted into his first full-length feature film, which was produced by American Zoetrope as THX 1138, but was not a success. Lucas then created his own company, Lucasfilm, Ltd., and directed the successful American Graffiti (1973).

Lucas then set his sights on adapting Flash Gordon, an adventure serial from his childhood that he fondly remembered. When he was unable to obtain the rights, he set out to write an original space adventure that would eventually become Star Wars. Despite his success with his previous film, all but one studio turned Star Wars down. It was only because Alan Ladd Jr. at 20th Century Fox liked American Graffiti that he forced through a production and distribution deal for the film, which ended up restoring Fox to financial stability after a number of flops. Star Wars was significantly influenced by samurai films of Akira Kurosawa, Spaghetti Westerns, as well as classic sword and sorcery fantasy stories.

Star Wars quickly became the highest-grossing film of all time, displaced five years later by Spielberg's E.T. the Extra-Terrestrial. After the success of American Graffiti and prior to the beginning of filming on Star Wars, Lucas was encouraged to renegotiate for a higher fee for writing and directing Star Wars than the US$150,000 agreed. He declined to do so, instead negotiating for advantage in some of the as-yet-unspecified parts of his contract with Fox, in particular, ownership of licensing and merchandising rights (for novelizations, clothing, toys, etc.) and contractual arrangements for sequels. Lucasfilm has earned hundreds of millions of dollars from licensed games, toys, and collectibles created for the franchise.

The original Star Wars film went through a tumultuous production, and during editing, Lucas suffered chest pains initially feared to be a heart attack, but actually a fit of hypertension and exhaustion. The effort that Lucas exerted during post-production for the film, and its subsequent sequels, caused strains on his relationship with his wife Marcia Lucas, and was a contributing factor to their divorce at the end of the trilogy. The success of the first Star Wars film also resulted in more attention focused on Lucas, both positive and negative, attracting wealth and fame, but also many people who wanted Lucas's financial backing or just to threaten him.

=== 1977–1993: Hiatus from directing and Indiana Jones ===
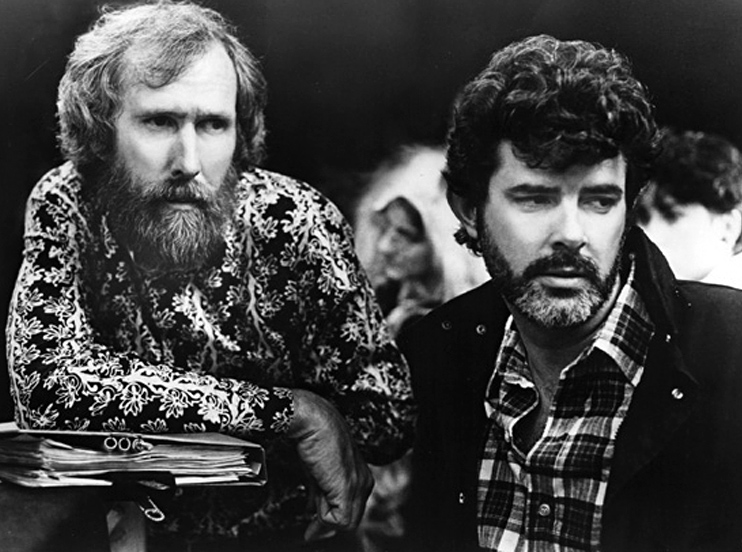
Director Jim Henson (left) and Lucas working on Labyrinth in 1986

Following the release of the first Star Wars film, Lucas worked extensively as a writer and producer, including on the many Star Wars spinoffs made for film, television and other media. Lucas acted as executive producer for the next two Star Wars films, commissioning Irvin Kershner to direct The Empire Strikes Back and Richard Marquand to direct Return of the Jedi, while receiving a story credit on the former and sharing a screenwriting credit with Lawrence Kasdan on the latter. Lucas also gave away his screenwriting credit out of great respect for Leigh Brackett for The Empire Strikes Back after her death from cancer. He also acted as story writer and executive producer on the first four Indiana Jones films, which his colleague and good friend Steven Spielberg directed.

Craig Barron, who worked at ILM as part of the matte painting department, told Star Wars Insider that Lucas liked to spend time with the department's painters and often spoke of what movies he wanted to make. According to Barron, Lucas had wanted to make a film about Alexander the Great, but this film was ultimately never produced. Projects where Lucas was credited as executive producer and sometimes story writer in this period include Kurosawa's Kagemusha (1980), John Korty's Twice Upon a Time (1983), Ewoks: Caravan of Courage (1984), Ewoks: Battle for Endor (1985), Mishima: A Life in Four Chapters (1985), Jim Henson's Labyrinth (1986), Coppola's Captain EO (1986), Ron Howard's Willow (1988), Don Bluth's The Land Before Time (1988), and the Indiana Jones television prequel spinoff The Young Indiana Jones Chronicles (1992–93). There were unsuccessful projects, however, including More American Graffiti (1979), Willard Huyck's Howard the Duck (1986), which was the biggest flop of Lucas's career, Coppola's Tucker: The Man and His Dream (1988) and Radioland Murders (1994) directed by Mel Smith.

In some cases, George Lucas served as an actual executive producer without being credited, such as in the films Body Heat (1981), Latino (1985), Return to Oz (1985), documentary Powaqqatsi (1988, credited only as "Presentation"), also Star Wars television projects: Holiday Special (1978), Droids (1985–1986), Ewoks (1985–1986) and Clone Wars (2003–2005).

The animation studio Pixar was founded in 1979 as the Graphics Group, one third of the Computer Division of Lucasfilm. Pixar's early computer graphics research resulted in a digital film The Adventures of André & Wally B. and groundbreaking effects in films such as Star Trek II: The Wrath of Khan and Young Sherlock Holmes, and the group was purchased in 1986 by Steve Jobs shortly after he left Apple Computer. Jobs paid Lucas $5 million and put $5 million as capital into the company. The sale reflected Lucas's desire to stop the cash flow losses from his seven-year research projects associated with new entertainment technology tools, as well as his company's new focus on creating entertainment rather than tools. Lucas, formerly a member of Writers Guild of America West, left and maintained financial core status in 1981.

As of June 1983, Lucas was worth $60 million, but he met cash-flow difficulties following his divorce that year, concurrent with the sudden dropoff in revenues from Star Wars licenses following the theatrical run of Return of the Jedi. At this point, Lucas had no desire to return to Star Wars, and had unofficially canceled the sequel trilogy. Also in 1983, Lucas and Tomlinson Holman founded the audio company THX. The company was formerly owned by Lucasfilm and contains equipment for stereo, digital, and theatrical sound for films, and music. Skywalker Sound and Industrial Light & Magic, are the sound and visual effects subdivisions of Lucasfilm, while Lucasfilm Games, later renamed LucasArts, produces products for the gaming industry.

=== 1993–2012: Return to directing, Star Wars, and Indiana Jones ===
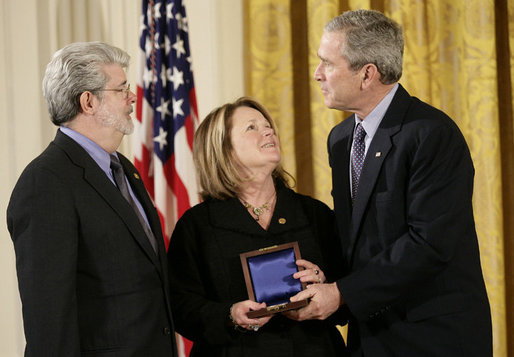
Lucas receiving the National Medal of Technology and Innovation from President George W. Bush, February 2006

Having lost much of his fortune in a divorce settlement in 1987, Lucas was hesitant on making additional Star Wars features. However, the prequels, which were still only a series of ideas partially pulled from his original drafts of "The Star Wars", continued to tantalize him with technical possibilities that would make it worthwhile to revisit his older material. When Star Wars became popular once again, in the wake of Dark Horse's comic book line and Timothy Zahn's trilogy of spin-off novels, Lucas realized that there was still a large audience. His children were older, and with the explosion of CGI technology he began to consider directing once again.

By 1993, it was announced, in Variety among other sources, that Lucas would be making the prequels. He began penning more to the story, indicating that the series would be a tragic one, examining Anakin Skywalker's fall to the dark side. Lucas also began to change the status of the prequels relative to the originals; at first, they were supposed to be a "filling-in" of history tangential to the originals, but now he saw that they could form the beginning of one long story that started with Anakin's childhood and ended with his death. This was the final step towards turning the film series into a "Saga". In 1994, Lucas began work on the screenplay of the first prequel, tentatively titled Episode I: The Beginning.

In 1997, to celebrate the 20th anniversary of Star Wars, Lucas restored the original trilogy and made numerous modifications using newly available digital technology to bring them closer to his original vision. The films were re-released in theaters as the "Special Editions". The trilogy received further modifications and restorations for DVD releases in 2004, Blu-ray releases in 2011 and 4K releases released in 2019. Additionally, Lucas released a director's cut of THX 1138 in 2004, with the film re-cut and containing a number of CGI additions.

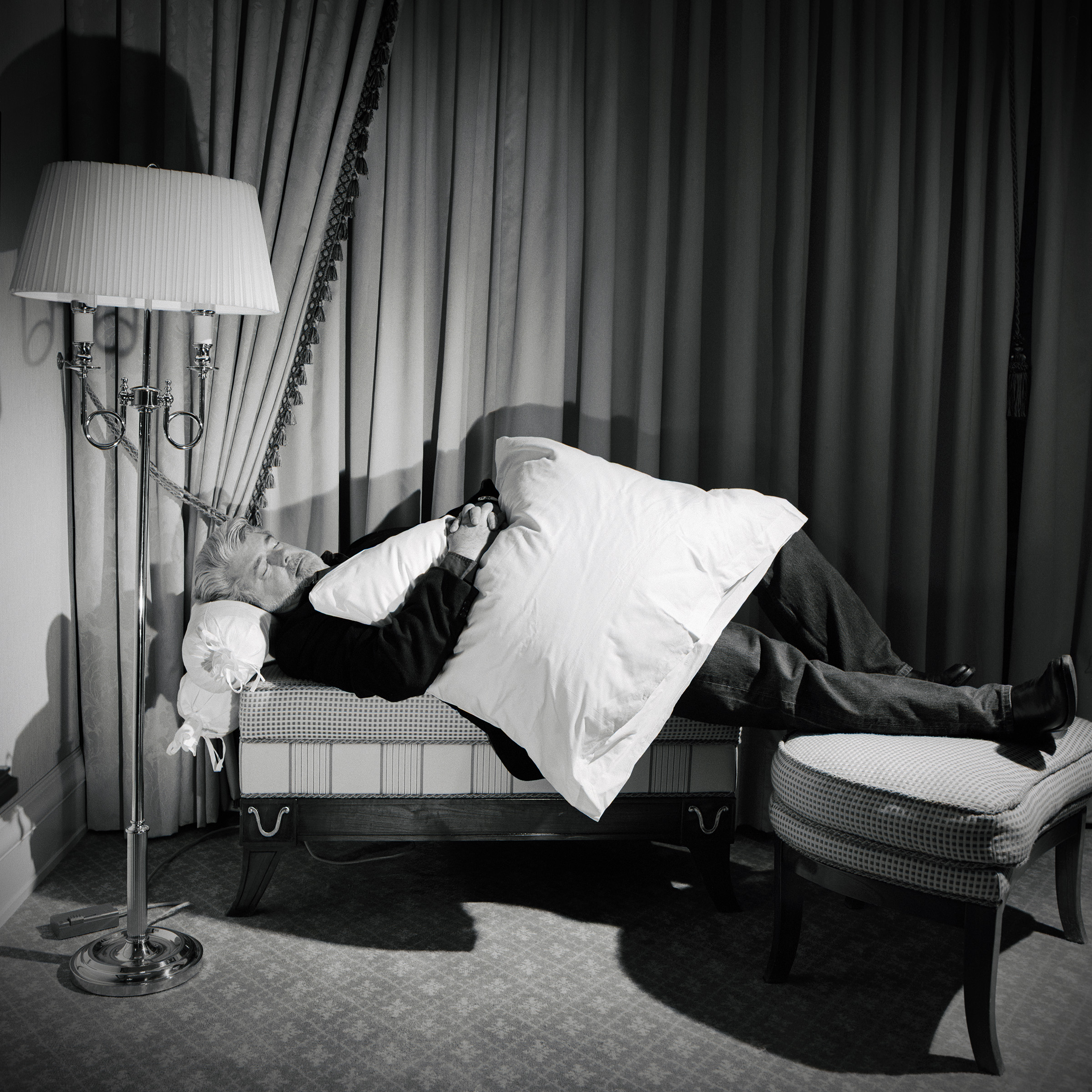
George Lucas, Berlin 2005 (Portrait by Oliver Mark)

The first Star Wars prequel was finished and released in 1999 as Episode I – The Phantom Menace, which would be the first film Lucas had directed in over two decades. Following the release of the first prequel, Lucas announced that he would also be directing the next two, and began working on Episode II. The first draft of Episode II was completed just weeks before principal photography, and Lucas hired Jonathan Hales, a writer from The Young Indiana Jones Chronicles, to polish it. It was completed and released in 2002 as Attack of the Clones. The final prequel, Episode III – Revenge of the Sith, began production in 2002 and was released in 2005. Numerous older fans and critics at the time considered the prequels more mixed compared to the original trilogy, though they were box office successes and popular with younger fans. In 2004, Lucas reflected that his transition from independent to corporate film-maker mirrored the story of Star Wars character Darth Vader in some ways, but concluded he was glad to be able to make his films the way he wanted to.

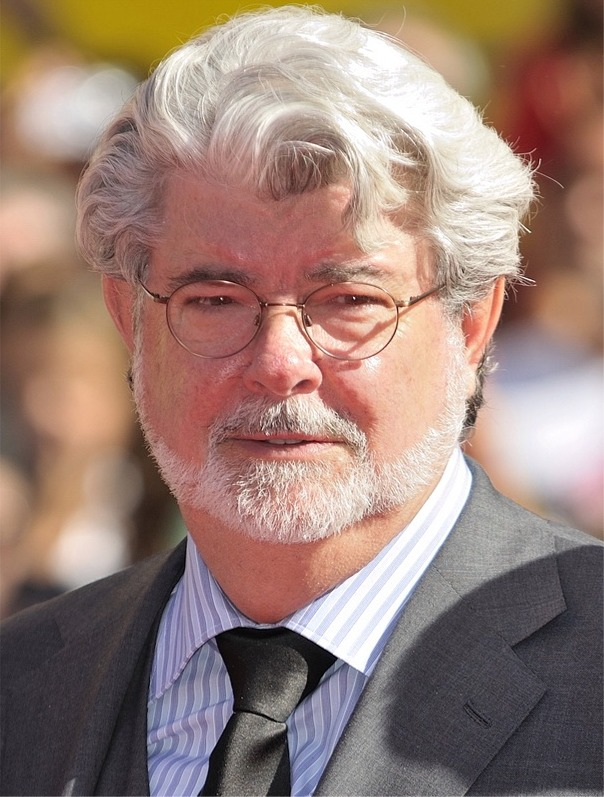
Lucas at the 2009 Venice Film Festival

Lucas collaborated with Jeff Nathanson as a writer of the 2008 film Indiana Jones and the Kingdom of the Crystal Skull, directed by Steven Spielberg. Similar to the Star Wars prequels, the reception was mixed with fans and critics alike. From 2008 to 2014, Lucas also served as the creator and executive producer for a second Star Wars animated series on Cartoon Network, Star Wars: The Clone Wars which premiered with a feature film of the same name before airing its first episode. The supervising director for this animated series was Dave Filoni, who was chosen by Lucas and closely collaborated with him on its development. (Note: Attributed to multiple references:) This series bridged the events between Attack of the Clones and Revenge of the Sith, and featured the last Star Wars stories in which Lucas was involved in a major way.

In 2012, Lucas self-funded and served as executive producer for Red Tails, a war film based on the exploits of the Tuskegee Airmen during World War II. He also took over directing of reshoots while director Anthony Hemingway worked on other projects.

=== 2012–present: Semi-retirement ===
I'm moving away from the business ... From the company, from all this kind of stuff.

— George Lucas on his future career plans

In January 2012, Lucas announced his retirement from producing large blockbuster films, and instead re-focusing his career on smaller, independently budgeted features.

In June 2012, it was announced that producer Kathleen Kennedy, a long-term collaborator with Steven Spielberg and a producer of the Indiana Jones films, had been appointed as co-chair of Lucasfilm Ltd. It was reported that Kennedy would work alongside Lucas, who would remain chief executive and serve as co-chairman for at least one year, after which she would succeed him as the company's sole leader. With the sale of Lucasfilm to Disney, Lucas is currently Disney's largest single shareholder.

Lucas worked as a creative consultant on the Star Wars sequel trilogy's first film, The Force Awakens. Lucas's involvement included attending early story meetings; according to Lucas, "I mostly say, 'You can't do this. You can do that.' You know, 'The cars don't have wheels. They fly with antigravity.' There's a million little pieces ... I know all that stuff." Lucas's son Jett told The Guardian that his father was "very torn" about having sold the rights to the franchise, despite having hand-picked Abrams to direct, and that his father was "there to guide" but that "he wants to let it go and become its new generation." Among the materials turned over to the production team were story treatments Lucas developed when he considered creating Episodes VII–IX himself; in January 2015, Lucas stated that Disney had discarded his story ideas.

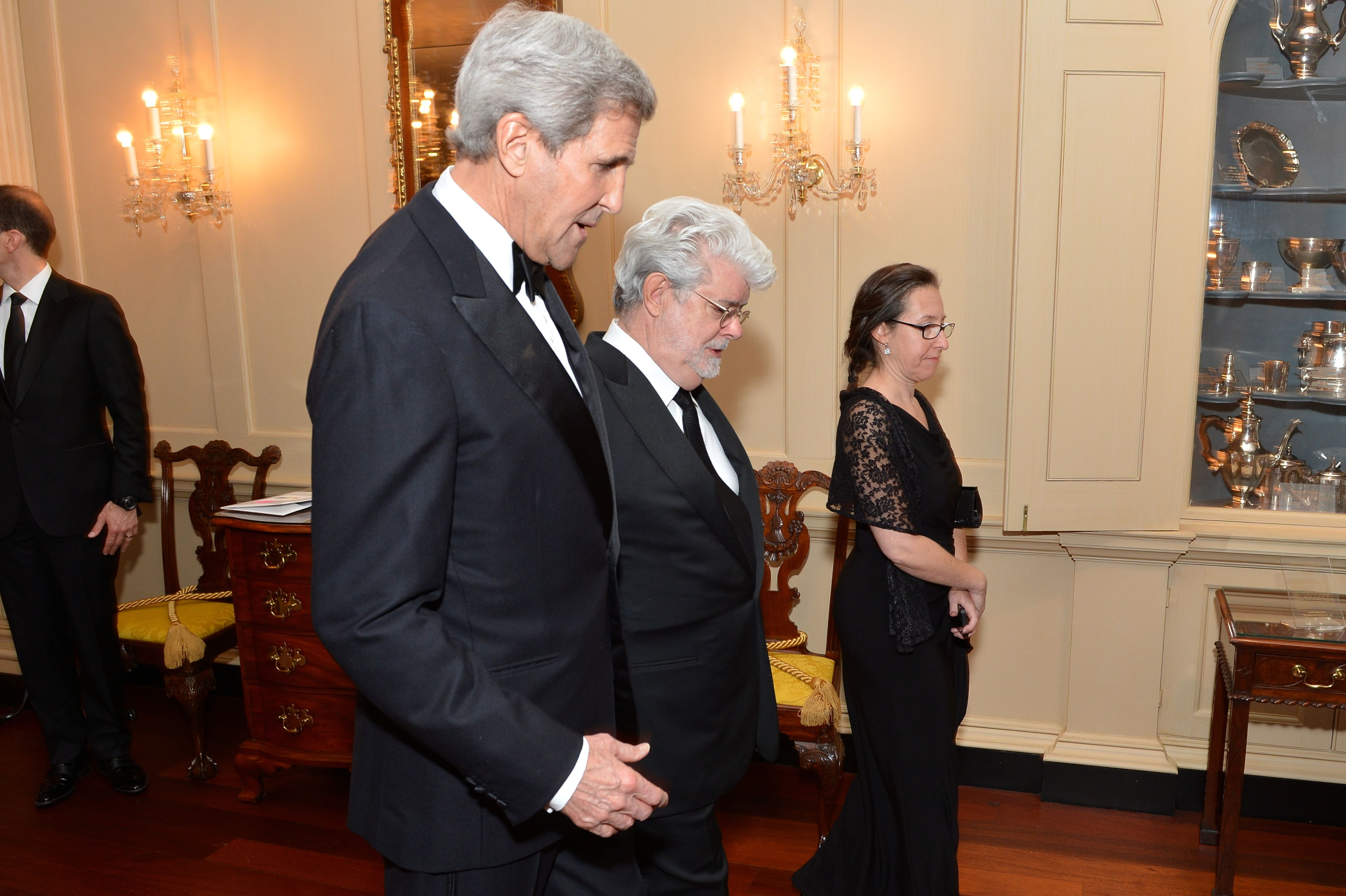
Lucas with Secretary of State John Kerry in Washington, D.C., on December 5, 2015

The Force Awakens, directed by J. J. Abrams, was released on December 18, 2015. Kathleen Kennedy produced the film and its sequels. The new sequel trilogy was jointly produced by Lucasfilm and the Walt Disney Company, which had acquired Lucasfilm in 2012. During an interview with talk show host and journalist Charlie Rose that aired on December 24, 2015, Lucas likened his decision to sell Lucasfilm to Disney to a divorce and outlined the creative differences between him and the producers of The Force Awakens. Lucas went on to say that he needed to support the company and its employees who were going to suffer financially. Lucas described the previous six Star Wars films as his "children" and defended his vision for them, while criticizing The Force Awakens for having a "retro feel", saying: "I worked very hard to make them completely different, with different planets, with different spaceships – you know, to make it new." Lucas also drew some criticism and subsequently apologized for his remark likening Disney to "white slavers".

In 2015, Lucas wrote the CGI film Strange Magic, his first musical. The film was produced at Skywalker Ranch. Gary Rydstrom directed the movie. At the same time the sequel trilogy was announced, a fifth installment of the Indiana Jones series also entered pre-development phase with Harrison Ford and Steven Spielberg set to return. Lucas originally did not specify whether the selling of Lucasfilm would affect his involvement with the film. In October 2016, Lucas announced his decision to not be involved in the story of the film but was nevertheless credited as an executive producer. In 2016, Rogue One: A Star Wars Story, the first film of a Star Wars anthology series was released. It told the story of the rebels who stole the plans for the Death Star featured in the original Star Wars film, and it was reported that Lucas liked it more than The Force Awakens. The Last Jedi, the second film in the sequel trilogy, was released in 2017; Lucas described the film as "beautifully made".

Lucas has had cursory involvement with Solo: A Star Wars Story (2018), the Star Wars streaming series The Mandalorian, and the premiere of the eighth season of Game of Thrones. Lucas met with J. J. Abrams before the latter began writing the script to the sequel trilogy's final film, The Rise of Skywalker, which was released in 2019.

== Other ventures ==
=== Lucasfilm ===
Lucasfilm Ltd. logo

Lucas founded a film production company Lucasfilm in 1971, and incorporated as Lucasfilm Ltd. on September 12, 1977. In the mid-1970s, the company's offices were located on the Universal Studios Lot. Lucas founded the Star Wars Corporation, Inc. as a subsidiary to control various legal and financial aspects of Star Wars (1977), including copyright, and sequel and merchandising rights. It also produced the 1978 Star Wars Holiday Special for 20th Century Fox Television. That year, Lucas hired Los Angeles-based real-estate specialist Charles Weber to manage the company, telling him that he could keep the job as long as he made money. Lucas wanted the focus of the company to be making independent films, but the company gradually became enlarged from five employees to almost 100, increasing in middle management and running up costs. In 1980, after Weber asked Lucas for fifty million dollars to invest in other companies and suggested that they sell Skywalker Ranch to do so, Lucas fired Weber and had to let half of the Los Angeles staff go. By the same year, the corporate subsidiary had been discontinued and its business was absorbed into the various divisions of Lucasfilm.

=== ILM ===
Lucas founded Industrial Light & Magic in 1975, he wanted his 1977 film Star Wars to include visual effects that had never been seen on film before. After discovering that the in-house effects department at 20th Century Fox was no longer operational, Lucas approached Douglas Trumbull, best known for the effects on 2001: A Space Odyssey (1968) and Silent Running (1972). Trumbull declined as he was already committed to working on Steven Spielberg's film Close Encounters of the Third Kind (1977), but suggested his assistant John Dykstra to Lucas. Dykstra brought together a small team of college students, artists, and engineers and set them up in a warehouse in Van Nuys, California. After seeing the map for the location was zoned as light industrial, Lucas named the group Industrial Light and Magic, which became the Special Visual Effects department on Star Wars. Alongside Dykstra, other leading members of the original ILM team were Ken Ralston, Richard Edlund, Dennis Muren, Robert Blalack, Joe Johnston, Phil Tippett, Steve Gawley, Lorne Peterson and Paul Huston.

=== Lucas Museum of Narrative Art ===
By June 2013, Lucas was considering establishing a museum, the Lucas Cultural Arts Museum, to be built on Crissy Field near the Golden Gate Bridge in San Francisco, which would display his collection of illustrations and pop art, with an estimated value of more than $1 billion. Lucas offered to pay the estimated $300 million cost of constructing the museum, and would endow it with $400 million when it opened, eventually adding an additional $400 million to its endowment. After being unable to reach an agreement with The Presidio Trust, Lucas turned to Chicago. A potential lakefront site on Museum Campus in Chicago was proposed in May 2014. By June 2014, Chicago had been selected, pending approval of the Chicago Plan Commission, which was granted. The museum project was renamed the Lucas Museum of Narrative Art. On June 24, 2016, Lucas announced that he was abandoning his plans to locate the museum in Chicago, due to a lawsuit by a local preservation group, Friends of the Parks, and would instead build the museum in California. On January 17, 2017, Lucas announced that an eleven-acre campus with green space and the museum's five-story 300,000 square foot building will be constructed over what was a parking lot in Exposition Park, Los Angeles, California. It was completed in 2026.

In July 2025, Lucas made his first ever appearance at San Diego Comic-Con, where he previewed the museum. At a panel, he showcased multiple pieces, including drawings from the original Iron Man comic, Indiana Jones concept art, Frida Kahlo paintings, and Peanuts sketches, that will be part of the museum's opening exhibits.

== Collaboration ==
Lucas was also heavily involved and invested in the scoring process for the original Star Wars soundtrack, which was composed by John Williams, on the recommendation of his friend and colleague Steven Spielberg. Whilst initially wanting to use tracks and film music in a similar manner to 2001: A Space Odyssey, which served as the inspiration for the film, Williams advised against this and instead proposed a system of recurring themes (or leitmotifs) to enhance the story in the style of classical composers Gustav Holst, William Walton, and Igor Stravinsky; works that Lucas had used as "temp tracks" for Williams to gain inspiration from. The film, and subsequent sequels and prequels, make use of the Main Title Theme, the Force Theme (less commonly referred to as Obi Wan Kenobi's Theme), the Rebel Alliance Theme and Princess Leia's Theme (all introduced in this film) repeatedly. Subsequent films also added to the catalog of themes for different characters, factions, and locations.

The score was released to critical acclaim and won Williams his third Academy Award for Best Original Score. The score was listed by the American Film Institute in 2005 as the greatest film score of all time. The professional relationship formed by Lucas and Williams extended through to Williams working on all of Lucas's blockbuster franchise movies: the remaining two films of the Star Wars original trilogy; all three films of prequel trilogy developed over fifteen years later; and the five films of the Indiana Jones franchise, in which Williams reunited with his long-time collaborator Spielberg. In his collaborations with Lucas, Williams received six of his fifty-two Academy Award nominations (Star Wars, The Empire Strikes Back, Return of the Jedi, Raiders of the Lost Ark, Indiana Jones and the Temple of Doom, and Indiana Jones and the Last Crusade). After Lucas sold Lucasfilm to Disney, Williams stayed on board with the franchise, and continued to score the remaining three films of the "Skywalker Saga" (The Force Awakens, The Last Jedi, and The Rise of Skywalker, for which he received a further three Oscar nominations), after which he announced his "retirement" from the series.

Lucas was in attendance for a ceremony honoring Williams as the 44th recipient of the AFI Life Achievement Award, the first composer to receive the honor, and gave a speech in praise of their relationship and his work. In interviews, and most famously at the 40th Anniversary Star Wars Celebration convention, Lucas has repeatedly reaffirmed the importance of Williams to the Star Wars saga, affectionately referring to him as the "secret sauce" of his movies.

== Philanthropy ==
Lucas is the wealthiest film celebrity in the world. His personal net worth is estimated to be $5.1 billion, making him one of the richest people in the entertainment industry. Lucas has pledged to give half of his fortune to charity as part of an effort called The Giving Pledge led by Bill Gates and Warren Buffett to persuade America's richest individuals to donate their financial wealth to charities.

=== George Lucas Educational Foundation ===
In 1991, The George Lucas Educational Foundation was founded as a nonprofit operating foundation to celebrate and encourage innovation in schools. The foundation's content is available under the brand Edutopia, in an award-winning web site, social media and via documentary films. Lucas, through his foundation, was one of the leading proponents of the E-Rate program in the universal service fund, which was enacted as part of the Telecommunications Act of 1996. On June 24, 2008, Lucas testified before the United States House of Representatives subcommittee on Telecommunications and the Internet as the head of his Foundation to advocate for a free wireless broadband educational network.

=== Proceeds from the sale of Lucasfilm to Disney ===
In 2012, Lucas sold Lucasfilm to the Walt Disney Company for a reported sum of $4.05 billion. It was widely reported at the time that Lucas intended to give the majority of the proceeds from the sale to charity. A spokesperson for Lucasfilm said: "George Lucas has expressed his intention, in the event the deal closes, to donate the majority of the proceeds to his philanthropic endeavors." Lucas also spoke on the matter: "For 41 years, the majority of my time and money has been put into the company. As I start a new chapter in my life, it is gratifying that I have the opportunity to devote more time and resources to philanthropy."

=== Other initiatives ===
In 2005, Lucas gave $1 million to help build the Martin Luther King Jr. Memorial on the National Mall in Washington, D.C., to commemorate American civil rights leader Martin Luther King Jr.

On September 19, 2006, the University of Southern California announced that Lucas had donated $175–180 million to his alma mater to expand the film school. It is the largest single donation to U.S.C. and the largest gift to a film school anywhere. Previous donations led to the already-existing George Lucas Instructional Building and Marcia Lucas Post-Production building.

In 2013, Lucas and his wife Mellody Hobson donated $25 million to the Chicago-based not-for-profit After School Matters, of which Hobson is the chair.

On April 15, 2016, it was reported that Lucas had donated between $501,000 and $1 million through the Lucas Family Foundation (now the Hobson/Lucas Family Foundation) to the Obama Foundation, which is charged with overseeing the construction of the Barack Obama Presidential Center on Chicago's South Side.

In 2021, Lucas and his wife Mellody Hobson made a donation to NYU through the Hobson/Lucas Family Foundation to establish the Martin Scorsese Institute of Global Cinematic Arts.

== Personal life ==
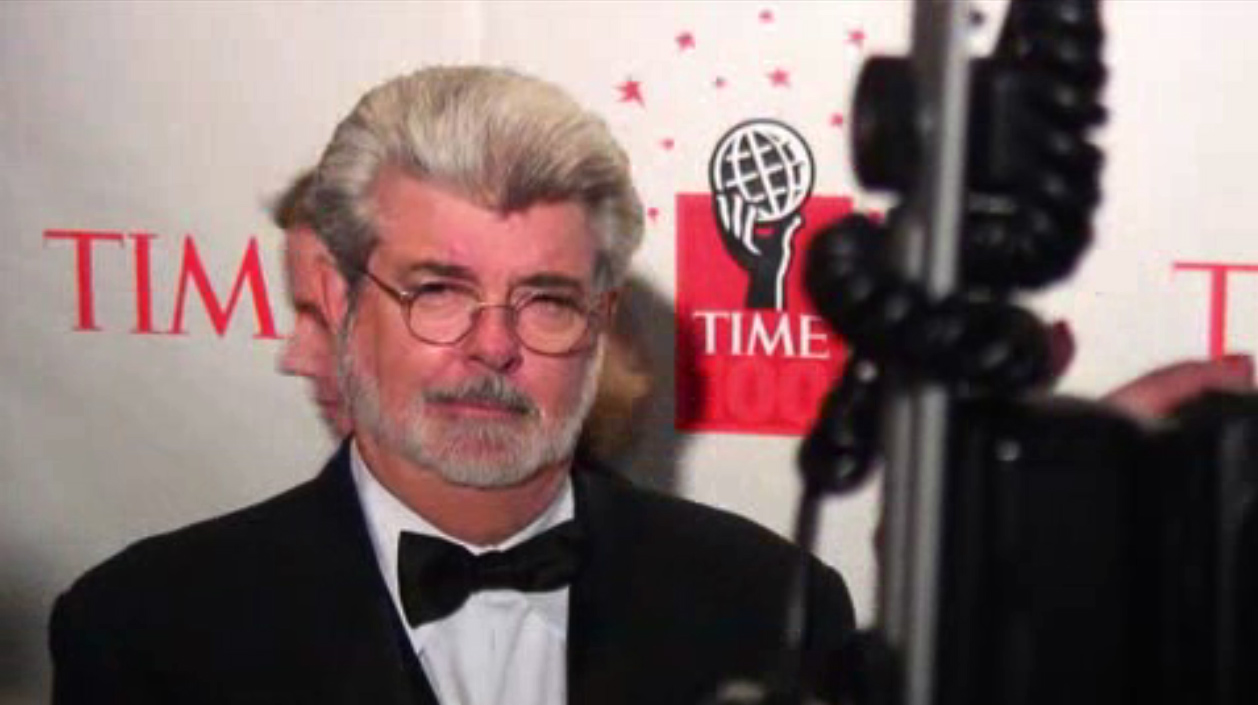
Lucas at the Time 100 2006 gala

In 1969, Lucas married film editor Marcia Lou Griffin, who went on to win an Academy Award for her editing work on the original Star Wars film. They adopted a daughter, Amanda Lucas, in 1981, and divorced in 1983. Lucas subsequently adopted two more children as a single parent: daughter Katie Lucas, born in 1988, and son Jett Lucas, born in 1993. His three eldest children all appeared in the three Star Wars prequels, as did Lucas himself. Following his divorce, Lucas was in a relationship with singer Linda Ronstadt in the 1980s.

Lucas began dating Mellody Hobson, president of Ariel Investments and chairwoman of Starbucks, in 2006, after meeting in 2005 at a business conference. She formerly served as chairwoman at DreamWorks Animation. (Note: Attributed to multiple references:) Lucas and Hobson announced their engagement in January 2013, and married on June 22, 2013, at Lucas's Skywalker Ranch in Marin County, California. They have one daughter together, born via surrogate in August 2013.

Lucas was born and raised in a Methodist family. The religious and mythical themes in Star Wars were inspired by Lucas's interest in the writings of mythologist Joseph Campbell, and he would eventually come to identify strongly with the Eastern religious philosophies he studied and incorporated into his films, which were a major inspiration for "the Force". Lucas has come to state that his religion is "Buddhist Methodist". He resides in Marin County.

Lucas is a major collector of the American illustrator and painter Norman Rockwell. A collection of 57 Rockwell paintings and drawings owned by Lucas and fellow Rockwell collector and film director Steven Spielberg were displayed at the Smithsonian American Art Museum from July 2, 2010, to January 2, 2011, in an exhibition titled Telling Stories.

Lucas has said that he is a fan of Seth MacFarlane's hit TV show Family Guy. MacFarlane has said that Lucasfilm was extremely helpful when the Family Guy crew wanted to parody their works.

Lucas supported Democratic candidate Hillary Clinton in the run-up for the 2016 U.S. presidential election.

== Filmography ==
Directed features
Year	Title
1971	THX 1138
1973	American Graffiti
1977	Star Wars
1999	Star Wars: Episode I – The Phantom Menace
2002	Star Wars: Episode II – Attack of the Clones
2005	Star Wars: Episode III – Revenge of the Sith

== Awards and honors ==
In 1977, Lucas was awarded the Inkpot Award.

The American Film Institute awarded Lucas its Life Achievement Award on June 9, 2005. This was shortly after the release of Star Wars: Episode III – Revenge of the Sith, about which he joked stating that, since he views the entire Star Wars series as one film, he could actually receive the award now that he had finally "gone back and finished the movie".

Lucas was nominated for four Academy Awards: Best Directing and Writing for American Graffiti and Star Wars. He received the academy's Irving G. Thalberg Award in 1991. He appeared at the 79th Academy Awards ceremony in 2007 with Steven Spielberg and Francis Ford Coppola to present the Best Director award to their friend Martin Scorsese. During the speech, Spielberg and Coppola talked about the joy of winning an Oscar, making fun of Lucas, who has not won a competitive Oscar.

The Science Fiction Hall of Fame inducted Lucas in 2006, its second "Film, Television, and Media" contributor, after Spielberg. (Note: After inducting 36 fantasy and science fiction writers and editors from 1996 to 2004, the Science Fiction and Fantasy Hall of Fame dropped "fantasy" and made non-literary contributors eligible. Filmmaker Steven Spielberg was the inaugural "Film, Television and Media" inductee in 2005; Lucas the second in 2006. Previously Lucas had received a special award at the 1977 World Science Fiction Convention (for Star Wars) and annual professional achievement awards voted by fantasy fans in 1981 and 1982.) The Discovery Channel named him one of the 100 "Greatest Americans" in September 2008. Lucas served as grand marshal for the Tournament of Roses Parade and made the ceremonial coin toss at the Rose Bowl, New Year's Day 2007. In 2009, he was one of 13 California Hall of Fame inductees in The California Museum's yearlong exhibit.

In July 2013, Lucas was awarded the National Medal of Arts by President Barack Obama for his contributions to American cinema. In October 2014, Lucas received Honorary Membership of the Society of Motion Picture and Television Engineers.

In August 2015, Lucas was inducted as a Disney Legend, and on December 6, 2015, he was an honoree at the Kennedy Center Honors. In 2021, coinciding with Lucasfilm's 50th anniversary, an action figure of Lucas in stormtrooper disguise was released as part of Hasbro's Star Wars: The Black Series.

In May 2024, Lucas was given the Honorary Palme d'Or at the Cannes Film Festival. It is considered one of the highest recognitions in the film industry.

In July 2026, Lucas was given the Legion of Honour by French President Emmanuel Macron. It is the highest recognition given in France.

Accolades received by Lucas' directed films
Year	Title	Academy Awards		BAFTAs		Golden Globes		Saturn Awards	
Year	Title	Nominations	Wins	Nominations	Wins	Nominations	Wins	Nominations	Wins
1973	American Graffiti	5		1		4	2		
1977	Star Wars: Episode IV - A New Hope	10	6	6	2	4	1	12	8
1999	Star Wars: Episode I - The Phantom Menace	3		2				10	2
2002	Star Wars: Episode II - Attack of the Clones	1						7	2
2005	Star Wars: Episode III - Revenge of the Sith	1						10	2
Total		20	6	9	2	8	3	39	14

== Bibliography ==
- 1980: Alan Arnold: A Journal of the Making of "The Empire Strikes Back". ISBN 0-345-29075-5. (contributor)
- 1983: Dale Pollock: Skywalking: The Life and Films of George Lucas. ISBN 978-0517546772. (contributor)
- 1995: George Lucas, Chris Claremont: Shadow Moon. ISBN 0-553-57285-7. (story)
- 1996: Chris Claremont: Shadow Dawn. ISBN 0-553-57289-X. (story)
- 1997: Laurent Bouzereau: Star Wars. The Annotated Screenplays. (contributor) ISBN 0-345-40981-7.
- 2000: Terry Brooks: Star Wars: Episode I – The Phantom Menace (novelization, contributor), Del Rey Books, ISBN 978-0-09-940996-0
- 2000: Chris Claremont: Shadow Star. ISBN 0-553-57288-1. (story)
- 2003: R. A. Salvatore: Star Wars: Episode II – Attack of the Clones (novelization, contributor), Del Rey, ISBN 978-0345428820
- 2004: Matthew Stover: Shatterpoint. (novel, prolog), Del Rey, ISBN 978-0345455741.
- 2005: James Luceno: Labyrinth of Evil (novel, contributor), Del Rey, ISBN 978-0345475732
- 2005: Matthew Stover: Star Wars: Episode III – Revenge of the Sith, Del Rey, ISBN 978-0345428844. (novelization, contributor & line editor)
- 2007: J. W. Rinzler: The Making of "Star Wars". The Definitive Story Behind the Original Film. ISBN 0-09-192014-0. (contributor)
- 2012: James Luceno: Star Wars: Darth Plagueis. novel (contributor), Del Rey, ISBN 978-0345511294.
- 2020: Paul Duncan: The Star Wars Archives. 1999–2005 (contributor), Taschen, ISBN 978-3836563444.

== See also ==
- List of oldest and youngest Academy Award winners and nominees — Youngest nominees for Best Director
- The Making of Star Wars
