= Herbie (film) =

- Directed by: George Lucas; Paul Golding
- Written by: George Lucas; Paul Golding
- Cinematography: George Lucas; Paul Golding
- Edited by: George Lucas; Paul Golding
- Music by: Herbie Hancock
- Distributed by: University of Southern California
- Release date: 1966
- Running time: 3 minutes
- Country: United States

Herbie is a short 16mm black and white movie by George Lucas and Paul Golding made in 1966 as part of their USC film school course. It is an abstract film with no story and no actors that depicts the reflections of moving light streaks and light flashes from traffic at night. It is set to a piece of jazz music the filmmakers misattributed to Herbie Hancock, whose first name was used for the title. The actual piece of music is “Basin Street Blues,” performed by the Miles Davis Quintet, and led by Hancock’s predecessor Victor Feldman.

== See also ==
- List of American films of 1966
