= Filmmaker (film) =

Filmmaker: a diary by george lucas
- Directed by: George Lucas
- Written by: George Lucas
- Produced by: Francis Ford Coppola (uncredited) (Note: While according to Pollock, Coppola gave Lucas the money for the documentary, he is not credited in the film's credits.)
- Starring: Francis Ford Coppola; Shirley Knight; Robert Duvall; James Caan; Ron Colby
- Cinematography: George Lucas
- Edited by: George Lucas; Marcia Griffin (uncredited)
- Production companies: American Zoetrope; Lucasfilm Ltd.
- Release date: 1968
- Running time: 32 minutes (Note: Myles and Pye incorrectly list Filmmaker as lasting forty minutes.)
- Country: United States
- Language: English
- Budget: $12,000

Filmmaker, or "Filmmaker: a diary by george lucas", is a 32-minute documentary made in 1968 by George Lucas about the making of Francis Ford Coppola's 1969 film The Rain People.

== Production ==
Coppola was working on The Rain People as a small, intimate film about real-life people, and Lucas decided to make a small, intimate cinema-verite documentary about the making of Coppola's film. Lucas pitched the idea of a documentary to Coppola, who gave Lucas the go-ahead, with the film paid for from Rain People's still photography budget.

The budget of the documentary was $12,000. Lucas filmed and recorded sound for the documentary himself, using an otherwise unutilised 16mm production camera and a Nagra tape recorder. Mona Skager, an associate on Rain People, often saw Lucas on the floor, shooting up through glass-topped tables. "It was basically because the camera was too heavy", she recalled. Ron Colby, producer on The Rain People, described Lucas's work habits: "George was around in a very quiet way. You'd look around and suddenly there'd be George in a corner with his camera. He'd just kind of drift around. But he shot the camera, did his own sound. He was very much a one-man band". Lucas would spend nearly every day shooting the documentary, while working on the script for THX 1138 at night.

Coppola was tolerant of the documentary's production process, although occasionally appeared unhappy when the camera invaded his privacy. Lucas filmed some confrontations between Coppola and actress Shirley Knight, but ultimately rejected most of the footage. "I decided to be discreet, I didn't want to destroy anyone's career", Lucas said later.

Lucas and his then-girlfriend/future wife, Marcia Griffin, edited Filmmaker. (Note: Marcia Griffin (Marcia Lucas) is not credited in the film's credits but is credited in Pollock's book as well as Rubin's.) Lucas described the documentary as "more therapy than anything else… I hadn't shot film for a long time".

The closing shot says the film was made at "Transamerica Sprocket Works", a fictitious company name that Lucas liked the sound of. The film was copyrighted by American Zoetrope/Lucasfilm Ltd.—the first film credit for the unofficial, then-new names of Coppola's and Lucas's respective companies.

== Release ==
Filmmaker was shown at the first incarnation of what would become the Mill Valley Film Festival in October 1977, and later at the first official MVFF in August 1978, both times shown along with The Rain People.

== Legacy ==
Dale Pollock, author of Skywalking: The Life and Films of George Lucas, wrote of the film in 1983: "Filmmaker remains one of the best documentaries about the production of a movie, as fresh and insightful today as it was in 1968… The thirty-minute film has the fluidity and detail of a written journal coupled with a cinematic sense of movement as the Rain People company goes from location to location". In 1989 Peter Cowie, author of Coppola: A Biography, wrote that Filmmaker was "one of the most important analyses of Coppola's craft and his incipient philosophy". In 1999, Michael Schumacher wrote, "Lucas's documentary, Filmmaker, caught the essence of the ups and downs of making The Rain People, from the exuberance of working on a risky yet fulfilling project that flew in the face of the way movies were normally made in Hollywood to Coppola's angry telephone confrontation with a Warner Bros.-Sever Arts official […]"

Coppola himself later admitted that the documentary "may be better than [The Rain People]". In a behind-the-scenes segment on the film Tetro, Tetro: How to Make Movies, Coppola mentions how he used the same camera dolly on Tetro as he did in The Rain People and as seen in Filmmaker.

According to Pollock, Lucas himself was proud of Filmmaker, his most ambitious effort at that time, and a film that contributed to advancing his career. It was to be his last short film before making his first feature, THX 1138.

== See also ==
- List of American films of 1968
- Apocalypse Now
