= 6-18-67 =

- Title card
- Directed by: George Lucas
- Written by: George Lucas
- Cinematography: George Lucas
- Release date: 1969
- Running time: 5 minutes
- Country: United States
- Language: English

6-18-67 is a short quasi-documentary film by George Lucas regarding the making of the 1969 Columbia film Mackenna's Gold. This non-story, non-character visual tone poem is made up of nature imagery, time-lapse photography, and the subtle sounds of the Arizona desert. Shooting was completed on June 18, 1967.

== See also ==
- List of American films of 1969
