= Look at Life (film) =

- The opening image of Look at Life
- Directed by: George Lucas
- Written by: George Lucas
- Cinematography: George Lucas
- Edited by: George Lucas
- Distributed by: University of Southern California
- Release date: 1965
- Running time: 1 minute
- Country: United States
- Language: English

Look at Life is a 1965 one-minute short student film by George Lucas, produced for a course in animation while Lucas was a film student at USC Film School. The film's running time of exactly one minute was required by the course. This was the first film made by George Lucas, and was heavily influenced by Canadian filmmaker Arthur Lipsett.

== Summary ==
The film is a montage of various iconic photographs focusing mostly on common themes from youth culture in the 1960s, with a frenetic percussion soundtrack taken from the film Black Orpheus. The imagery includes photographs of Martin Luther King Jr., Nikita Khrushchev, American race riots, the Ku Klux Klan, Buddhist monks, beagle puppies and bodies of dead soldiers. The only narration in the film is a man's voice yelling the text of Proverbs 10:12, "Hate stirreth up strife, while love covereth all sins." The film ends with written text: "ANYONE FOR SURVIVAL", followed by "End" and "?".

== Availability ==
The film is included in the documentary A Legacy of Filmmakers: The Early Years of American Zoetrope, which was released on the DVD and Blu-ray releases of Lucas' first feature film, THX 1138.

== See also ==
- List of American films of 1965
- Still image film
- Life Magazine
