= The Emperor (film) =

- Bob Hudson in The Emperor
- Directed by: George Lucas
- Written by: George Lucas; Paul Golding; Bob Hudson; John Milius; Rick Robertson; Gary Rockland
- Starring: Bob Hudson
- Cinematography: Mike Brown; Gary Young
- Edited by: Paul Golding; Rick Robertson
- Distributed by: University of Southern California
- Release date: 1967
- Running time: 24 mins
- Country: U.S.
- Language: English

The Emperor is a short film by George Lucas about the radio DJ Bob Hudson (known as "The Emperor"), made while Lucas was a film student at the University of Southern California's film school.

== Production ==
The film was made in 1967 when Lucas returned to USC as a graduate student. A 20-minute documentary, the film was made in 10 weeks.

== See also ==
- List of American films of 1967
