= Electronic Labyrinth: THX 1138 4EB =

1967 short film by George Lucas

- THX escaping the electronic labyrinth
- Directed by: George Lucas
- Written by: George Lucas
- Starring: Dan Nachtsheim (Note: The actor's family name is incorrectly listed in the film's closing credits as Natchsheim.)
- Cinematography: F. E. Zip Zimmerman
- Edited by: Dan Nachtsheim
- Music by: The Yardbirds, "Still I'm Sad" (opening credits)
- Distributed by: University of Southern California
- Release date: 1967
- Running time: 15 minutes
- Country: United States
- Language: English

Electronic Labyrinth: THX 1138 4EB is a 1967 social science-fiction short film written and directed by George Lucas while he attended the University of Southern California's film school. Lucas reworked the short into the 1971 theatrical feature THX 1138.

In 2010, the film was selected for preservation in the United States National Film Registry by the Library of Congress as being "culturally, historically, or aesthetically significant".

== Plot ==
The film is set in a highly administered technological society. The date is given as May 14, 2187. Under questioning, YYO 7117 denies being in love with their mate THX 1138 4EB, a sexually conceived "eros body." Computer operators exchange radio messages about THX 1138, who is spotted on cameras running through a corridor. After THX 1138 refuses a command to stop and takes a conveyance to the lower levels, the operators place an agonizing mind-block on them which they are able to defeat. An enhanced "perfect body" pursues them through the lower levels. They confront and kill the perfect body, astonishing the operators. THX 1138 reaches a door, pries it open, and escapes the structure. As THX 1138 continues running through the countryside into the sunset, the government tells YYO 7117 that THX "destroyed themself" and gives instructions for requesting a new mate.

The USC program guide accompanying the film describes it as a "nightmare impression of a world in which a man is trying to escape a computerized world which constantly tracks his movements".

== Cast ==
- Dan Nachtsheim as THX 1138 4EB
- Joy Carmichael as YYO 7117
- David Munson as 2222
- Marvin Bennett as 0480
- Ralph Stell as 9021

== Production ==
Lucas had an idea for a long time "based on the concept that we live in the future and that you could make a futuristic film using existing stuff". Fellow USC students Matthew Robbins and Walter Murch had a similar idea which Robbins developed into a short treatment, but Robbins and Murch lost interest in the idea, whereas Lucas was keen to persist. Years later, in "The Making of THX 1138" DVD featurette, Robbins recalls that the "EB" in the title (and the character's serial number name) stands for "Earth born".

One of Lucas' USC instructors suggested an opportunity for Lucas to make the short film that he had in mind: since the 1940s, the USC film school had a working arrangement with the US Navy, whereby Navy filmmakers attended USC for additional study. Teaching the class was not popular amongst USC staff, as the Navy filmmakers often had rigid, preconceived ideas about filmmaking, and sometimes misbehaved in class. However, the Navy paid for unlimited color film and lab processing costs for their students. Lucas offered to teach the class, and was allowed the opportunity.

The Navy men formed the crew of the film, and some appeared in the cast. Because of the Navy connection, Lucas was able to access filming locations which would not otherwise have been available to him: the USC computer center, a parking lot at UCLA, the Los Angeles International Airport, and the Van Nuys Airport. Much of the filming was done at night, with some on weekends.

The film was completed in 12 weeks, with Lucas editing it on the Moviola at the home of Verna Fields, where he was working during the day editing United States Information Agency films under Fields' supervision.

=== Score ===
An eclectic soundtrack includes organ music from Bach's Passacaglia in C minor and modified excerpts from Virgil Fox Plays the Wanamaker Grand Court Organ.

== Reception ==
The film screened at the Edinburgh International Film Festival on August 23, 1967. In January 1968, the film won first prize in the category of Dramatic films at the third National Student Film Festival held at the Lincoln Center, New York, where it was seen and admired by Steven Spielberg, who had not previously met Lucas. It also came to notice of parts of the mainstream film industry, such as Los Angeles Times film critic Charles Champlin, and Ned Tanen, then a Universal Studios production executive, who was later involved with Lucas' American Graffiti.

== Feature film ==
In 1971, Lucas re-worked the short as a theatrical feature, THX 1138. The last act of the feature-length THX 1138 roughly corresponds with the events in this film. In the final scene, people are warned not to exit the underground city through the door, which allegedly leads to death. In truth, the exit leads to their freedom. Cosmetically, there are similarities in coloring and appearance, although one noticeable difference is the actors did not have to shave their heads for the short film, unlike the later feature version.

== Versions ==
The film became widely available on the bonus disc of the 2004 George Lucas Director's Cut DVD release of THX 1138, and later on the Blu-ray release. The film also exists as a 16 mm reference print and on videocassette with a run time of 15 minutes.
