= 1:42.08 =

1966 American film by George Lucas

- Directed by: George Lucas
- Written by: George Lucas
- Starring: Pete Brock
- Cinematography: George Lucas
- Edited by: George Lucas; Alan Gadney; George Hubbard; Mike Padilla
- Distributed by: University of Southern California
- Release date: 1966
- Running time: 7 minutes
- Country: United States
- Language: English

1:42.08 (also known as 1:42.08: A Man and His Car and 1:42.08: To Qualify) is George Lucas's 1966 senior project at the University of Southern California. It was named for the lap time of the Lotus 23 race car that was the subject of the film.

It is a non-story visual tone poem depicting the imagery of a car going at full speed, and featuring the car's engine as the primary sound element. Shot on 16mm color film with a 14-man student crew, it was filmed at Willow Springs Raceway, north of Los Angeles, California. The Lotus 23 was driven by Pete Brock.

Lucas cited the influence of Jean-Claude Labrecque's 1965 short documentary on a cycling competition, 60 Cycles, on 1:42.08.

== See also ==
- List of American films of 1966
