= Amanda Lucas =

Amanda Lucas may refer to:

- Amanda Lucas (fighter) (born 1981), professional mixed martial artist and daughter of George Lucas
- Amanda Lucas (netball) (born 1983), Australian netball player
