= Weapons Factory =

Weapons Factory may refer to:

- Weapons factory, an industrial facility that manufactures armaments
- "Weapons Factory" (Star Wars: The Clone Wars), a 2009 TV episode
