= List of Star Wars: Clone Wars episodes =

List of Star Wars: Clone Wars episodes may refer to:

- List of Star Wars: Clone Wars (2003 TV series) episodes (2003–2005)
- List of Star Wars: The Clone Wars episodes (2008–2020)
