= Amanda Lucas (netball) =

Australian netball player

Personal information
- Born: 7 September 1983 (age 42)
- Height: 1.78 m (5 ft 10 in)

Netball career
- Playing positions: C, WA
Years	Club team	Apps
up to 2007	Queensland Firebirds	
- Updated on 2009-03-21

Amanda Lucas (born 7 September 1983) is an Australian netball player. She played for the Queensland Firebirds in the Commonwealth Bank Trophy.
