= Katie Lucas =

American actress (born 1988)

- Born: Katie Rose Lucas; April 13, 1988 (age 38)
- Occupations: Actress, writer
- Father: George Lucas
- Relatives: Amanda Lucas (sister)

Katie Rose Lucas (born April 13, 1988) is an American actress and writer. She is the adopted daughter of filmmaker George Lucas, goddaughter of both Steven Spielberg and Francis Ford Coppola and younger sister of Amanda Lucas.

Lucas had minor roles in all three Star Wars prequels. She portrayed young Anakin's friend, Amee, in The Phantom Menace; the purple Twi'lek girl Lunae Minx in Attack of the Clones; and Senator Chi Eekway in Revenge of the Sith.

Lucas was a writer for the Star Wars: The Clone Wars TV series.

== Filmography ==
- Star Wars: Episode I – The Phantom Menace (1999) – Amee (as Jenna Green)
- The Beginning: Making 'Episode I' (2001) – Herself
- Star Wars: Episode II – Attack of the Clones (2002) – Lunae Minx (uncredited)
- Ben and Holly (2005) – Little Sister (as Jenna Green)
- Star Wars: Episode III – Revenge of the Sith (2005) – Chi Eekway

=== Writer ===
Star Wars: The Clone Wars

- "Jedi Crash"
- "Sphere of Influence", with Steve Melching
- "The Academy", with Steven Melching
- "Assassin"
- "Nightsisters" Trilogy:
  - "Nightsisters"
  - "Monster"
  - "Witches of the Mist"
- "Darth Maul Returns" Arc:
  - "Massacre"
  - "Bounty"
  - "Brothers"
  - "Revenge"
- "Order 66 Genesis" Arc:
  - "Unknown"
  - "Conspiracy"
  - "Fugitive"
  - "Orders"
