= Amanda Lucas (fighter) =

American martial artist (born 1981)

- Born: July 15, 1981 (age 45); U.S. Virgin Islands
- Other names: Powerhouse
- Nationality: American
- Height: 5 ft 4 in (1.63 m)
- Weight: 156 lb (71 kg; 11.1 st)
- Division: Lightweight
- Fighting out of: San Francisco, California, U.S.
- Team: Syndicate MMA
- Years active: 2008–2012

Mixed martial arts record
- Total: 6
- Wins: 5
- By submission: 3
- By decision: 2
- Losses: 1
- By knockout: 1

Other information
- Mixed martial arts record from Sherdog

Amanda Lucas (born July 15, 1981) is an American former professional mixed martial artist. She is the eldest daughter of filmmaker George Lucas and film editor Marcia Lucas.

== Early life ==
Amanda Lucas is the daughter of George and Marcia Lucas. She was adopted during their marriage, after they unsuccessfully tried to conceive a child. Subsequent to her parents' divorce in 1983, legal custody of Amanda was equally split between George and Marcia as part of the terms of their settlement.

== Mixed martial arts career ==
After her husband brought her to a mixed martial arts event, Lucas took an interest in fighting, feeling it would help her lose weight and overcome her childhood bullying growing up as "a 'fat and wimpy' kid." She earned a purple belt in Brazilian jiu-jitsu, and also trained in Muay Thai.

Known as "Powerhouse," Lucas was knocked out in the third round of her 2008 pro MMA debut but rebounded the following year with a unanimous decision victory to even her record.

Lucas faced Hikaru Shinohara at DEEP: "55 Impact" on August 26, 2011. She defeated Shinohara by technical submission due to an armbar in the first round.

She returned to DEEP at "Cage Impact 2011 in Tokyo" on October 29, 2011. Lucas defeated Mika Harigai by submission due to a rear-naked choke in round one.

Lucas next faced professional wrestler and MMA veteran Yumiko Hotta at DEEP: "57 Impact" on February 18, 2012. The fight was contested for the DEEP women's open-weight championship. Lucas defeated Hotta by submission due to a keylock in the third round.

On December 8, 2012, Lucas faced Yuiga in a non-title bout at DEEP: "Cage Impact 2012 in Tokyo." The use of elbows was permitted in the fight. Lucas defeated Yuiga by majority decision.

Lucas planned to fight twice in 2013, but the first bout fell through and the second was cancelled as the result of Lucas sustaining an injury. She eventually decided to withdraw from MMA activities to have a child, her son Felix, born in July 2014.

== Championships and accomplishments ==
=== Mixed martial arts ===
- Deep
  - Deep Openweight Women's Championship

==== Mixed martial arts record ====
Professional record breakdown
6 matches	5 wins	1 loss
By knockout	0	1
By submission	3	0
By decision	2	0

Res.	Record	Opponent	Method	Event	Date	Round	Time	Location	Notes
Win	5–1	Yuiga	Decision (majority)	DEEP: Cage Impact 2012 in Tokyo	December 8, 2012	2	5:00	Tokyo, Japan	Non-title bout
Win	4–1	Yumiko Hotta	Submission (keylock)	DEEP: 57 Impact	February 18, 2012	3	2:16	Tokyo, Japan	Won DEEP Openweight Women’s Championship
Win	3–1	Mika Harigai	Submission (rear-naked choke)	Deep: Cage Impact 2011 in Tokyo, 1st Round	October 29, 2011	1	4:32	Tokyo, Japan	
Win	2–1	Hikaru Shinohara	Technical Submission (armbar)	Deep: 55 Impact	August 26, 2011	1	4:37	Tokyo, Japan	
Win	1–1	Christen Bedwell	Decision (unanimous)	Freestyle Cage Fighting 37	July 11, 2009	3	3:00	Tulsa, Oklahoma, United States	
Loss	0–1	Nicole Kavanaugh	TKO (punches)	Princesses of Pain: Australasia vs. America	May 31, 2008	3	2:24	Auckland, New Zealand	

== Film roles ==
Amanda and her younger sister Katie appeared in Star Wars: Episode I – The Phantom Menace (1999) in credited roles. Amanda was the voice of Tey How, the alien controller in the droid control ship. She was credited as Tyger. She can also be seen in Jabba the Hutt's box during the Podrace scene as Diva Funquita.

Amanda also appeared in the other two prequels, as did her sister Katie and her younger brother Jett. None of them were, however, credited for Star Wars: Episode II – Attack of the Clones (2002). In this movie, Amanda made a cameo as Adnama, one of the patrons in the Outlander Club, in the scene where Anakin Skywalker chases Zam Wesell.

She was credited again, this time as Amanda Lucas, for Star Wars: Episode III – Revenge of the Sith (2005). Her role was given the name of Terr Taneel, although she did not have any lines. She is one of the human senators next to Bail Organa and Mon Mothma. The man Lucas talks to in the scene is her husband, Jason Hallikaine.

== Personal life ==
Amanda is the only adopted daughter of Marcia Lucas. As a single father George Lucas adopted her younger siblings Katie and Jett. She is married to Jason Hallikainen and their son, Felix, was born in 2014.

== See also ==
- List of current mixed martial arts champions
- List of female mixed martial artists
