= Bald (disambiguation) =

Bald most commonly refers to:

- Hair loss, a loss of hair from part of the head or body
- Bald by choice, someone with a shaved head

Bald may also refer to:

== Places ==
- Báld, the Hungarian name for Balda village, Sărmașu, Romania
- Appalachian balds, a type of mountain summit in the Appalachian Mountains
- Bald Head, Antarctica
- Bald Hill (Australia)
- Bald Hill (Farmingville, New York)
- Bald Hill (disambiguation)
- Bald Hills, Queensland
- Bald Hills (disambiguation)
- Bald Island, Western Australia
- Bald Knob, Arkansas
- Bald Knob, West Virginia
- Bald Mountain (disambiguation)
- Bald Point, Florida
- Bald River, Tennessee

== People ==
- Bald (surname)

== Animals ==
- Bald eagle, a bird of prey found in North America
- Bald-faced hornet, a large member of the yellowjacket genus found in North America

== Arts, entertainment, and media ==
- "Bald" (song), a 2005 song by The Darkness
- Bald: The Making of THX 1138 (1971), a short film directed by George Lucas
- Bald! (2003), a documentary on baldness
- r/bald, a subreddit where participants share their experiences with and discuss hair loss.

== See also ==
- Baldhead (disambiguation)
- Baldy (disambiguation)
