= Bald Mountain =

Bald Mountain may refer to:

== Geographic locations in the United States ==
- Bald Mountain (Heceta Island), Alaska
- Bald Mountain (California), a name given to over fifty summits in California
  - Bald Mountain (Humboldt County)
- Grass Valley Bald Mountain, a peak near Little Grass Valley Reservoir in California
- Bald Mountain (Summit County, Colorado)
- Bald Mountain (Murray County, Georgia)
- Bald Mountain (Idaho)
- Bald Mountain (Dedham, Maine), site of a plane crash in Dedham, Maine
- Bald Mountain (Michigan)
- Bald Mountain Recreation Area, Oakland County, Michigan
- Bald Mountain, Jefferson County, Montana
- Bald Mountain, Madison County, Montana
- Bald Mountain, Mineral County, Montana
- Bald Mountain, Park County, Montana
- Bald Mountain (Lincoln County, Nevada), a mountain peak of Nevada
- Bald Mountain (Lyon County, Nevada)
- Bald Mountain (New Jersey)
- Bald Mountain (Greene County, New York)
- Bald Mountain (Herkimer County, New York)
- Bald Mountain (Lewis County, New York)
- Bald Mountain (Sullivan County, New York)
- Bald Mountain (Schoharie County, New York)
- Bald Mountain Brook, a river in Herkimer County, New York
- Bald Mountain (Oregon), in the Cascade Range
- Bald Mountain (Pennsylvania)
- Bald Mountain (Uinta Range), Utah
- Bald Mountain, Bennington, Vermont
- Bald Mountain (Washington), a name given to about 15 summits in Washington
- Bald Mountain, a peak of the White Rock ridgeline of New York, Vermont, and Massachusetts
- Bald Mountains, a subrange of the Appalachian Mountains spanning the Tennessee-North Carolina border
- Central Nevada Bald Mountain, a biome of the Central Basin and Range ecoregion

== Other uses ==
- Bald Mountain (film), a 2013 Brazilian film
- Bald Mountain (folklore), a location where, in Slavic folklore, witches gather for their Sabbath
- Bald Mountain mine, a gold mine in Nevada, US
- Bald Mountain Ski Area, Idaho, US
- Bald Mountain, a location in the 1940 Walt Disney animated film Fantasia

== See also ==
- The Bald Mountain meteorite of 1929
- Lysá hora (translated as "Bald Mountain"), a mountain in the Czech Republic
- Mount Pelée (translated as "Bald Mountain"), a volcano in Martinique
- Serra Pelada (translated as "Bald Mountain"), a large gold mine in Brazil
- Night on Bald Mountain, compositions by Modest Mussorgsky and Nikolay Rimsky-Korsakov
- Monte Baldo, a mountain range in the Italian Alps
- Bald Hill
- Lysaya Gora
- Lysaya Mountain (Zhiguli)
