= Bald Mountain (New York) =

Bald Mountain (New York) may refer to:

- Bald Mountain (Herkimer County, New York)
- Bald Mountain (Lewis County, New York)
- Bald Mountain Brook
