= Old Baldy =

Old Baldy may refer to:

== Places ==
- One of a list of peaks named Baldy
- Bald Head Lighthouse, in Bald Head, North Carolina
- Mount San Antonio, a summit in Southern California also called "Mount Baldy"
- Old Baldy (Lynch, Nebraska), a hill visited by the Lewis and Clark Expedition
- Old Baldy (Fisher Range), a mountain in Alberta, Canada

== Animals ==
- Old Baldy (horse), belonged to General George G. Meade in the American Civil War

== Events ==
- Battle of Old Baldy, a series of engagements in the Korean War

== See also ==
- Baldy Mountain
- Bald Mountain (disambiguation)
- Baldy (disambiguation)
