= Bald (surname) =

Bald is a surname. Notable people with the surname include:

- Alexander Bald (1783–1859), Scottish poet
- Detlef Bald (born 1941), German political scientist and military historian
- Eddie Bald (1874–1946), American cyclist and automobile racing driver
- F. Clever Bald (1897–1970), American teacher and director of the Bentley Historical Library at the University of Michigan
- John W. Bald (1868–1961), Canadian photographer
- Kathy Bald (born 1963), Canadian swimmer
- Ken Bald (1920–2019), American illustrator and comic book artist
- Robert Bald (1776–1861), Scottish surveyor, civil and mining engineer, and antiquarian, brother of Alexander
- William Bald (c. 1789–1857), Scottish surveyor, cartographer, and civil engineer, cousin of Alexander and Robert
