= Bald Hill =

Bald Hill may refer to:

== Australia ==
- Bald Hill (Australia), a popular lookout in Illawarra, New South Wales
- Bald Hill Lithium and Tantalum Mine, Western Australia

== Russia ==
- Bald Hill, Russia, within the Duderhof Heights

== United States ==
- Bald Hill, Texas, unincorporated community in Texas
- Bald Hill, Limestone County, Texas, ghost town in Texas; named for summit
- Bald Hill (Farmingville, New York), One of the highest points on Long Island, New York
- Bald Hill (Hudson Highlands), hill in New York state
- Bald Hill (Mendocino County), hill in California
- Bald Hill (Washington County, Missouri)
- Bald Hill (Snohomish County, Washington)
- Bald Hill, in San Anselmo, California; see list of summits of the San Francisco Bay Area
- Bald Hill, mountain summit in Monroe, New York
- Bald Hill Range, mountain range in Middlesex County, Connecticut
- Bald Hill in Mineral County, Montana

== See also ==
- Bald Hills (disambiguation)
- Lysaya Gora
- Lysaya Mountain (Zhiguli)
