= Baldy =

Baldy refers to a person with no hair or someone with alopecia.

Baldy may also refer to:

== People ==
- Baldy (nickname)
- Pen name of Clifford H. Baldowski (1917–1999), American editorial cartoonist
- Daniel Baldy (born 1994), German politician
- Leonard Baldy (1927–1960), Chicago police officer and the city's first helicopter traffic reporter

== Places ==
- Numerous peaks; see List of peaks named Baldy
- Bałdy, a village in Poland
- Mount Baldy Ski Lifts (or Baldy), a ski resort in California

== See also ==
- Old Baldy (disambiguation)
- Baldi (disambiguation)
- Baldies, a real-time strategy video game
