= Lysaya Gora =

Lysaya Gora (Russian: Лысая Гора, literally Bald Hill) is the name of several rural localities in Russia.

Modern localities

- Lysaya Gora, Kaluga Oblast, a selo in Tarussky District of Kaluga Oblast
- Lysaya Gora, Republic of Mordovia, a selo in Novousadsky Selsoviet of Yelnikovsky District in the Republic of Mordovia; 54°29′N 44°1′E
- Lysaya Gora, Lyskovsky District, Nizhny Novgorod Oblast, a village in Trofimovsky Selsoviet of Lyskovsky District in Nizhny Novgorod Oblast; 56°2′N 45°4′E
- Lysaya Gora, Vorotynsky District, Nizhny Novgorod Oblast, a settlement in Otarsky Selsoviet of Vorotynsky District in Nizhny Novgorod Oblast; 56°6′N 45°58′E
- Lysaya Gora, Perm Krai, a village in Chernushinsky District of Perm Krai
- Lysaya Gora, Pskov Oblast, a village in Usvyatsky District of Pskov Oblast
- Lysaya Gora, Saratov Oblast, a village in Saratov City of Saratov Oblast
- Lysaya Gora, Vologda Oblast, a village in Shchetinsky Selsoviet of Cherepovetsky District in Vologda Oblast

Abolished localities

- Lysaya Gora, Tomsk Oblast, a village in Molchanovsky District of Tomsk Oblast; abolished in December 2014

== See also ==
- Bald Hill
