= Bald Mountain (California) =

Name of many mountains in the American state of California

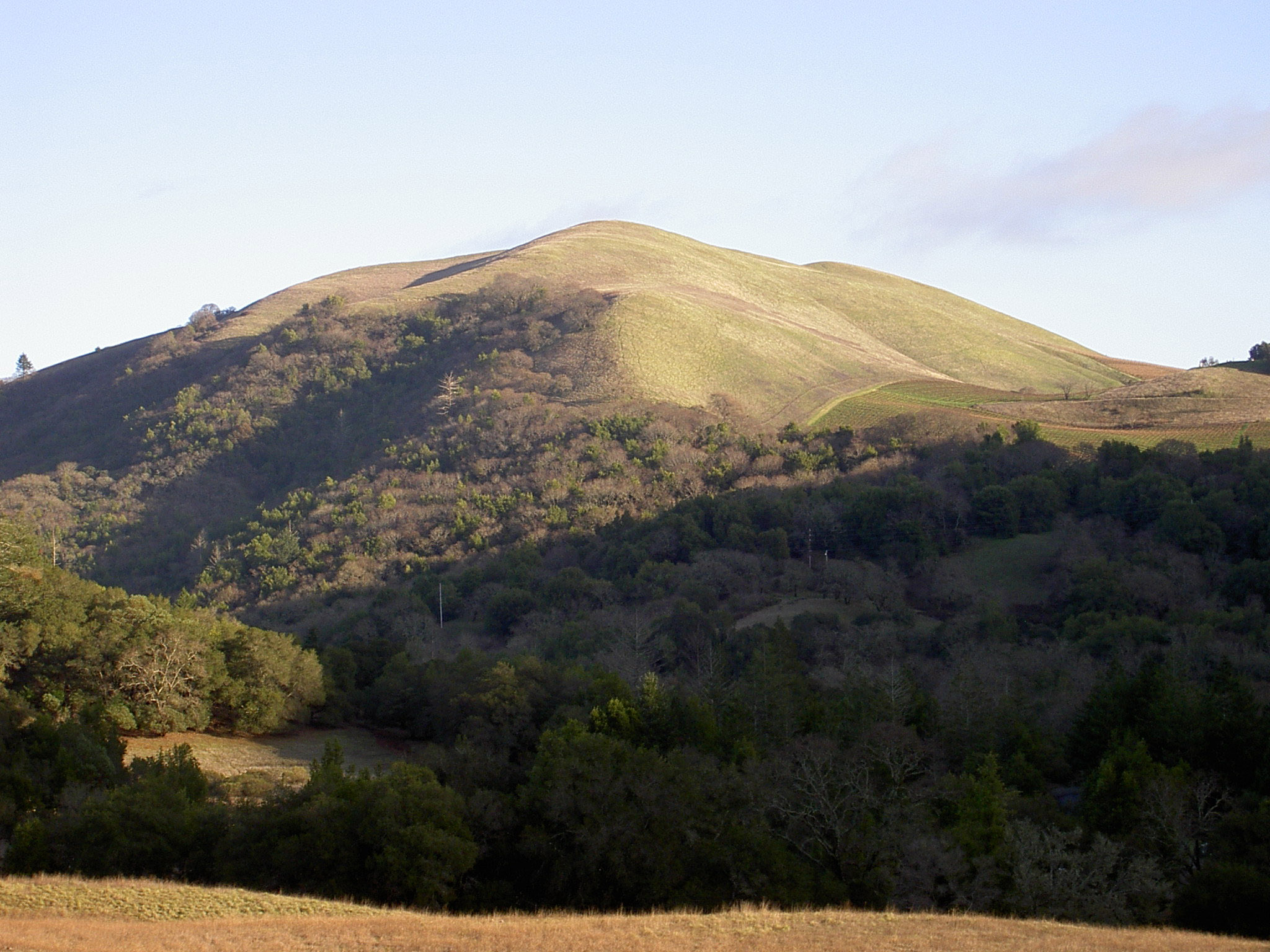
Bald Mountain just south (outside of) Sugarloaf Ridge State Park.

Bald Mountain is a name given to over fifty summits in California.

- In Sugarloaf Ridge State Park there is a Bald Mountain summit located on the Sonoma-Napa County border at 38°27′27″N 122°30′34″W, and rising to an elevation of 2,730 ft (832 m). Sonoma Creek rises from its southeastern flank, the source of Bear Creek is on its northern flank, and its northeastern flank drains to the Napa River.
- Located on the Sonoma-Napa County border just south of Sugarloaf Ridge State Park, there is a Bald Mountain summit at 38°25′46″N 122°29′36″W, rising to an elevation of 2,260 ft (689 m).
- In Los Angeles County there is a Bald Mountain at 34°44′39″N 118°43′40″W that rises to an elevation of 4,528 ft (1,380 m).
- In Humboldt County there is a Bald Mountain at 40°52′56″N 123°51′56″W west of McKinleyville that rises to an elevation of 3,150 ft (960 m).
- In San Benito County there is a Bald Mountain at 36°34′14″N 121°05′24″W that rises to an elevation of 2,920 ft (890 m).
- In Santa Cruz County there is a Bald Mountain at 37°01′30″N 122°08′26″W that rises to an elevation of 1,309 ft (399 m).
- In Fresno County there are four:
  - a Bald Mountain at 37°06′14″N 119°12′20″W that rises to an elevation of 7,838 ft (2,389 m).
  - a Bald Mountain at 36°11′44″N 120°35′43″W that rises to an elevation of 3,799 ft (1,158 m).
  - a Bald Mountain at 36°45′58″N 119°12′13″W that rises to an elevation of 3,510 ft (1,070 m).
  - a Bald Mountain at 37°03′44″N 119°24′01″W that rises to an elevation of 4,810 ft (1,466 m).
- In Santa Clara County there is a Bald Mountain at 37°09′36″N 121°52′02″W that rises to an elevation of 2,382 ft (726 m).
- In San Joaquin County there is a Bald Mountain at 37°34′47″N 121°31′04″W that rises to an elevation of 2,844 ft (867 m).
- In Calaveras County there are three:
  - a Bald Mountain at 38°08′18″N 120°57′02″W that rises to an elevation of 502 ft (153 m).
  - a Bald Mountain at 38°25′10″N 120°26′37″W that rises to an elevation of 4,091 ft (1,247 m).
  - a Bald Mountain at 38°05′31″N 120°27′25″W that rises to an elevation of 2,192 ft (668 m).
- In Tuolumne County there are three:
  - a Bald Mountain at 38°08′41″N 120°05′14″W that rises to an elevation of 5,810 ft (1,771 m).
  - a Bald Mountain at 37°51′19″N 119°47′25″W that rises to an elevation of 7,244 ft (2,208 m).
  - a Bald Mountain at 38°00′30″N 120°21′47″W that rises to an elevation of 3,333 ft (1,016 m).
- In Yolo County there is a Bald Mountain at 38°47′13″N 122°07′23″W that rises to an elevation of 1,811 ft (552 m).
- In El Dorado County there are two:
  - a Bald Mountain at 38°54′15″N 120°42′19″W that rises to an elevation of 4,580 ft (1,396 m).
  - a Bald Mountain at 38°46′01″N 120°13′20″W that rises to an elevation of 6,991 ft (2,131 m).
- In Lake County there is a Bald Mountain at 38°58′44″N 122°38′42″W that rises to an elevation of 2,165 ft (660 m).
- In Placer County there is a Bald Mountain at 39°17′49″N 120°10′58″W that rises to an elevation of 6,758 ft (2,060 m).
- In Mendocino County there are six:
  - a Bald Mountain at 39°48′09″N 123°37′14″W that rises to an elevation of 3,455 ft (1,053 m).
  - a Bald Mountain at 39°58′06″N 123°17′04″W that rises to an elevation of 3,894 ft (1,187 m).
  - a Bald Mountain at 39°33′47″N 123°11′07″W that rises to an elevation of 4,196 ft (1,279 m).
  - a Bald Mountain at 39°34′21″N 123°21′20″W that rises to an elevation of 2,297 ft (700 m).
  - a Bald Mountain at 39°42′52″N 123°10′38″W that rises to an elevation of 2,320 ft (707 m).
  - a Bald Mountain at 39°37′14″N 122°58′26″W that rises to an elevation of 6,732 ft (2,052 m).
- In Shasta County there are three:
  - a Bald Mountain at 41°05′49″N 121°51′19″W that rises to an elevation of 5,377 ft (1,639 m).
  - a Bald Mountain at 41°06′00″N 122°09′58″W that rises to an elevation of 4,623 ft (1,409 m).
  - a Bald Mountain at 40°54′02″N 121°22′40″W that rises to an elevation of 5,558 ft (1,694 m).
- In Modoc County there are three:
  - a Bald Mountain at 41°36′36″N 120°16′12″W that rises to an elevation of 8,261 ft (2,518 m).
  - a Bald Mountain at 41°11′14″N 120°33′29″W that rises to an elevation of 5,896 ft (1,797 m).
  - a Bald Mountain at 41°15′02″N 120°13′47″W that rises to an elevation of 7,697 ft (2,346 m).
- In Lassen County there are two:
  - a Bald Mountain at 40°20′19″N 120°27′28″W that rises to an elevation of 5,210 ft (1,588 m).
  - a Bald Mountain at 40°55′02″N 121°05′36″W that rises to an elevation of 6,069 ft (1,850 m).
- In Riverside County there is a Bald Mountain at 33°40′29″N 116°32′36″W that rises to an elevation of 4,409 ft (1,344 m).
- In Santa Barbara County there are two:
  - at 34°31′53″N 120°05′28″W that rises to an elevation of 2,612 ft (796 m).
  - at 34°48′45″N 119°56′07″W that rises to an elevation of 3,966 ft (1,209 m).
- In Tulare County there are two:
  - a Bald Mountain at 35°48′42″N 118°49′41″W that rises to an elevation of 2,382 ft (726 m).
  - a Bald Mountain at 36°01′11″N 118°15′14″W that rises to an elevation of 9,383 ft (2,860 m).
- In Sierra County there are two:
  - a Bald Mountain at 39°30′25″N 120°49′49″W that rises to an elevation of 5,791 ft (1,765 m).
  - a Bald Mountain at 39°34′31″N 120°53′53″W that rises to an elevation of 5,515 ft (1,681 m).
- In Mono County there is a Bald Mountain at 37°47′02″N 118°54′04″W that rises to an elevation of 9,085 ft (2,769 m).
- In Nevada County there are two:
  - a Bald Mountain at 39°20′04″N 121°00′48″W that rises to an elevation of 3,113 ft (949 m).
  - a Bald Mountain at 39°07′06″N 121°10′40″W that rises to an elevation of 1,463 ft (446 m).
- In San Luis Obispo County there are two:
  - a Bald Mountain at 35°08′57″N 120°18′33″W that rises to an elevation of 2,044 ft (623 m).
  - a Bald Mountain at 35°14′23″N 120°30′11″W that rises to an elevation of 2,805 ft (855 m).
- In Monterey County there is a Bald Mountain at 35°51′48″N 121°07′27″W that rises to an elevation of 2,136 ft (651 m).
- In Mariposa County there is a Bald Mountain at 37°43′34″N 120°09′52″W that rises to an elevation of 3,173 ft (967 m).
- In Siskiyou County there are two:
  - a Bald Mountain at 41°23′31″N 123°34′32″W that rises to an elevation of 4,419 ft (1,347 m).
  - a Bald Mountain at 41°46′43″N 122°56′22″W that rises to an elevation of 5,387 ft (1,642 m).
- In Butte County there is a Bald Mountain at 39°57′10″N 121°28′57″W that rises to an elevation of 5,777 ft (1,761 m).

== See also ==
- List of summits of the San Francisco Bay Area
- Bald Mountain, other mountains with the name
