= THX 1138 =

1971 film by George Lucas

- Theatrical release poster
- Directed by: George Lucas
- Screenplay by: George Lucas; Walter Murch
- Story by: George Lucas
- Based on: Electronic Labyrinth: THX 1138 4EB by George Lucas
- Produced by: Lawrence Sturhahn
- Starring: Robert Duvall; Donald Pleasence; Don Pedro Colley; Maggie McOmie; Ian Wolfe
- Cinematography: David Myers; Albert Kihn
- Edited by: George Lucas
- Music by: Lalo Schifrin
- Production company: American Zoetrope
- Distributed by: Warner Bros.
- Release date: March 11, 1971
- Running time: 88 minutes
- Country: United States
- Language: English
- Budget: $777,777
- Box office: $2.4 million

THX 1138 is a 1971 American social science fiction film co-written and directed by George Lucas in his feature directorial debut. Produced by Francis Ford Coppola and co-written by Walter Murch, the film stars Robert Duvall and Donald Pleasence, with Don Pedro Colley, Maggie McOmie, and Ian Wolfe in supporting roles. The film is set in a dystopian future in which the citizens are controlled by android police and mandatory use of drugs that suppress emotions.

THX 1138 was developed from Lucas's 1967 student film Electronic Labyrinth: THX 1138 4EB, which he created while attending the USC School of Cinematic Arts. The feature film was produced in a joint venture between Warner Bros. and American Zoetrope. A novelization by Ben Bova was published in 1971.

The film received mixed reviews from critics, and though it was a modest commercial success, it underperformed at the box office upon its initial release, but it has subsequently received critical acclaim and gained a cult following, particularly in the aftermath of Lucas's success with Star Wars (1977). A director's cut prepared by Lucas was released in 2004.

== Plot ==
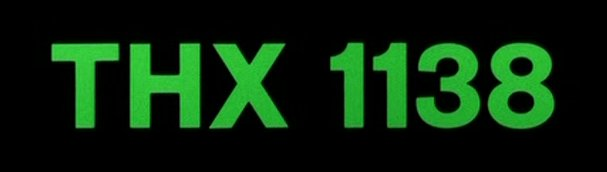
The film's title card

In the dystopian future, sexual intercourse and reproduction are prohibited, and mind-altering drugs are mandatory to enforce compliance among the citizens and to ensure their ability to conduct dangerous and demanding tasks. Workers wear identical white uniforms and have shaven heads to emphasize uniformity; the police androids wear black and monks are robed. Instead of names, people have designations with three arbitrary letters (referred to as the "prefix") and four digits, shown on an identity badge worn at all times.

At their jobs in central video control centers, SEN 5241 (a man) and LUH 3417 (a woman) keep surveillance on the city. LUH has a male roommate named THX 1138, who works in a factory producing android police officers. At the beginning of the story, THX finishes his shift, while the loudspeakers urge the workers to "increase safety"—and congratulate them for only losing 195 workers in the last period—to the competing factory's 242. On the way home, he stops at a confession booth. A Christ-like portrait of "OMM 0000" intones reassuringly as he worries that his sedatives are not working and LUH has been acting strangely.

At home, THX takes his drugs and watches holobroadcasts while engaging with a masturbatory device. LUH secretly substitutes pills in her possession for THX's medications, causing him to develop nausea, anxiety and sexual desire. LUH and THX become involved romantically and have sex. THX is later confronted by SEN, who attempts to arrange that THX become his new roommate but THX files a complaint against SEN for the illegal shift pattern change.

Without drugs in his system, THX falters during a dangerous part of his job, and a control center engages a "mind lock" on THX, which raises the level of danger. After the release of the mind lock, THX corrects that work phase. THX and LUH are arrested and THX undergoes drug therapy and medical analysis. He enjoys a brief reunion with LUH, but it is disrupted shortly after she reveals her pregnancy.

At THX's trial, it is stated that THX was clinically born. It is decided that it would be inefficient to terminate THX, so THX is sentenced to prison, with SEN. THX and SEN walk to search for an exit. Eventually they are joined by hologram actor SRT 5752, who starred in the holobroadcasts. SRT shows them the exit and suggests to them that they may have been going in circles. During the escape, THX and SRT are separated from SEN. Chased by the police androids, THX and SRT are trapped in a control center, from which THX learns that LUH has been "consumed", and her name has been reassigned to her fetus, numbered 66691, in a growth chamber. SEN eventually escapes to an area reserved for the monks of OMM, where a monk notices that SEN has no identification badge. SEN attacks him and later wanders into a child-rearing area, strikes up a conversation with children and sits aimlessly until police androids apprehend him. THX and SRT steal two cars. SRT struggles to figure out how to drive the car. When SRT finally gets the car to move, he immediately crashes into a concrete pillar. After the crash, SRT is not found in the vehicle.

Pursued by two police androids on motorcycles, THX flees to the limits of the city. Android officers continue to pursue him as he briefly struggles with simian-like creatures identified as "shell dwellers" and arrives at a vertical shaft with an escape ladder. The android officers are ordered by Central Command to cease pursuit, on the grounds that the expense of his capture exceeds their budget for THX. In a last attempt to convince THX to surrender, the officers claim that the area outside the "city shell" is uninhabitable but he is undeterred and continues up the ladder. The city is then revealed to be entirely underground and THX has escaped onto the surface, where he witnesses a sunset.

== Cast ==
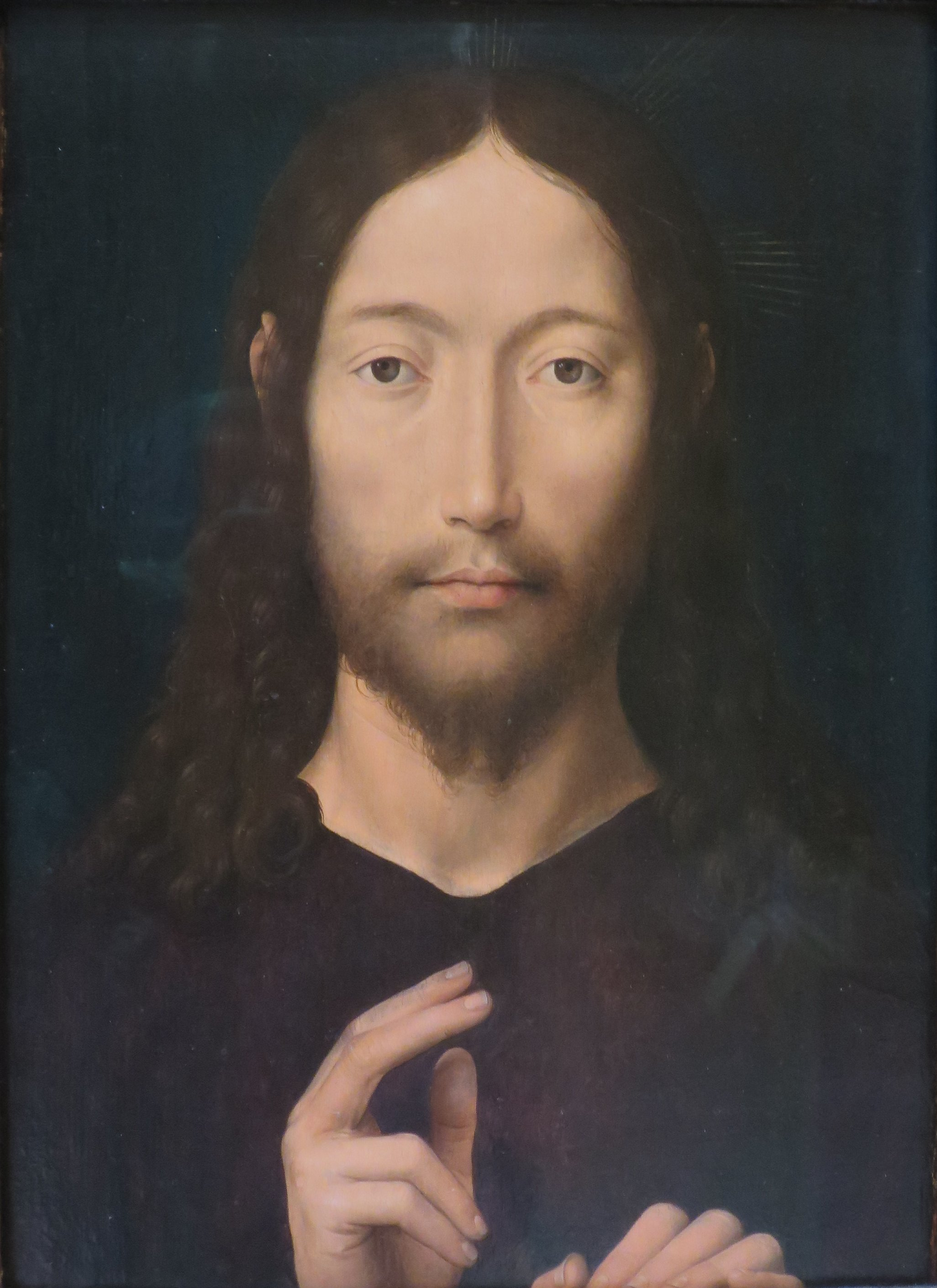
Hans Memling's Christ Giving His Blessing (1478) is used as the visual representation of the state-sanctioned deity OMM 0000.

- Robert Duvall as THX 1138
- Donald Pleasence as SEN 5241
- Maggie McOmie as LUH 3417
- Don Pedro Colley as the hologram SRT 5752
- Ian Wolfe as the old prisoner PTO
- Marshall Efron as prisoner TWA
- Sid Haig as prisoner NCH
- Irene Cagen (as Irene Forrest) as prisoner IMM
- John Pearce as prisoner DWY
- Mark Lawhead as Shell Dweller
- James Wheaton as the voice of OMM 0000

The announcer voices include those of Scott Beach, Terence McGovern, and David Ogden Stiers (billed as David Ogden Steers).

== Production ==
THX 1138 was the first film of a planned seven-picture slate commissioned by Warner Bros. from the 1969 incarnation of American Zoetrope. George Lucas wrote the initial script draft based on his earlier short film, but Francis Ford Coppola and Lucas agreed that it was unsatisfactory. Walter Murch assisted Lucas in writing an improved final draft. For some of SEN's dialogue in the film, the script included excerpts from speeches by Richard Nixon.

The script required almost the entire cast to shave their heads, either completely bald or with buzz cuts. As a publicity stunt, several actors were filmed having their first haircuts and shaves at unusual venues, with the results used in a promotional featurette titled Bald: The Making of THX 1138. Many of the extras were recruited from the nearby Synanon, an addiction-recovery program that later became a violent cult.

Filming began on September 22, 1969. The schedule was planned for 35–40 days, completing in November 1969. Lucas filmed THX 1138 in Techniscope.

Most filming locations are in the San Francisco area, including the unfinished tunnels of the Bay Area Rapid Transit subway system, the Lawrence Livermore National Laboratory, the Marin County Civic Center in San Rafael designed by Frank Lloyd Wright, the Lawrence Hall of Science in Berkeley, the San Francisco International Airport and at a remote manipulator for a hot cell. Several scenes show one of the FAA 9020 IBM System/360 used for air traffic control multicomputer installation (the only version with a "360 Mode" button on the console). Studio sequences were shot at stages in Los Angeles, including a white stage 100 by 150 feet (30 by 46 m) for the "white limbo" sequences. Lucas used entirely natural light.

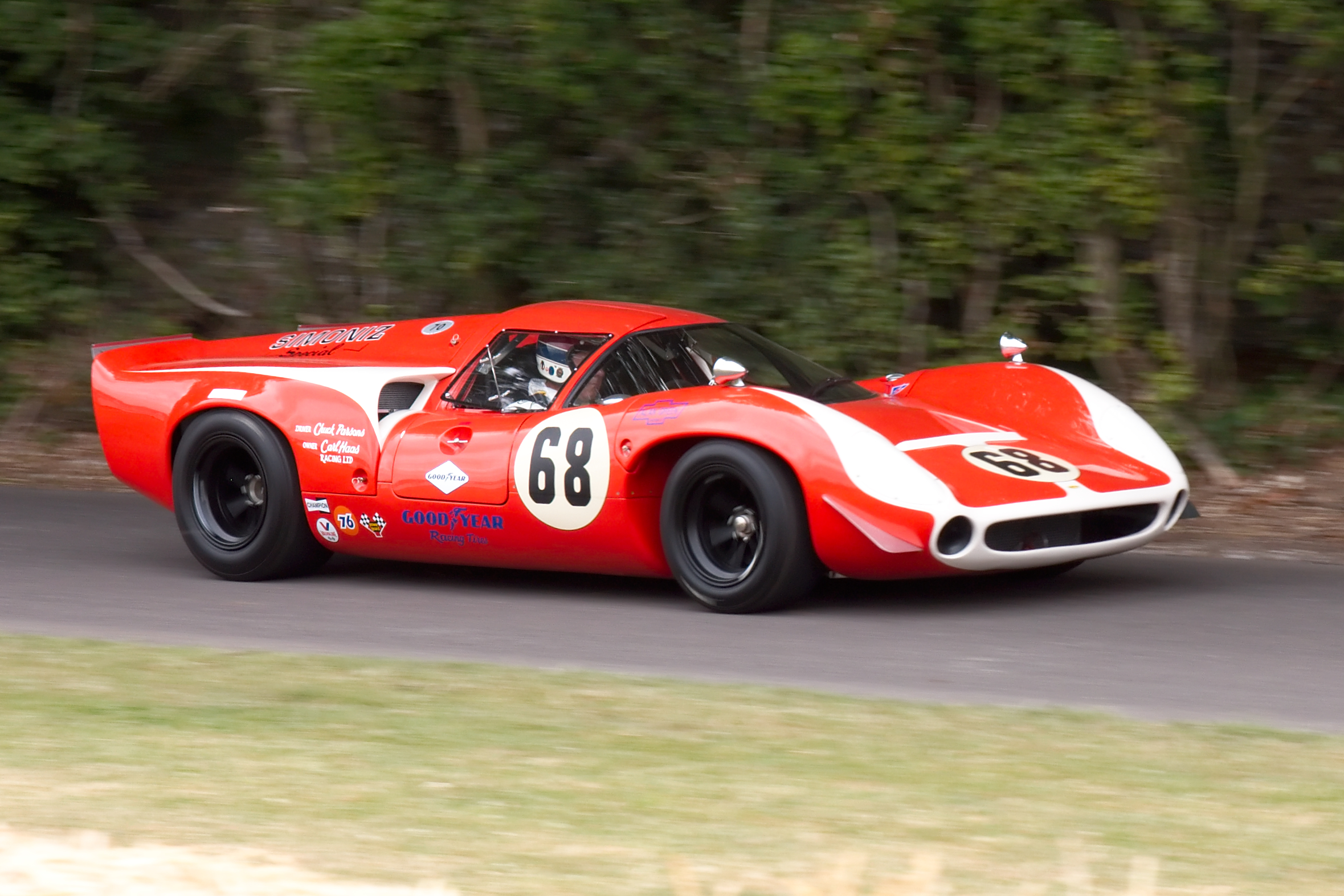
Modified Lola T70s were used in the film.

The chase scene features two Lola T70 Mk III race cars chased by Yamaha TA125/250 cc two-stroke, race-replica motorcycles through two San Francisco Bay Area automotive tunnels: the Caldecott Tunnel between Oakland and Orinda and the underwater Posey Tube between Oakland and Alameda. According to Caleb Deschanel, cars were driven at speeds of 140 miles per hour (230 km/h) while filming the chase. Other cars appearing in the film include custom-built Ferrari Thomassima cars, one of which is on display in the Ferrari museum in Modena, Italy.

The chase features a motorcycle stunt in which stuntman Ronald "Duffy" Hambleton (credited as Duffy Hamilton) rode his police motorcycle full speed into a fallen scaffold, with a ramp built to his specification. He flew over the handlebars, was hit by the airborne motorcycle, landed in the street on his back, and slammed into the crashed car in which Duvall's character had escaped. According to Lucas, Hambleton was uninjured but angry at the people who came to his aid, worried that they may have ruined the stunt by walking into frame.

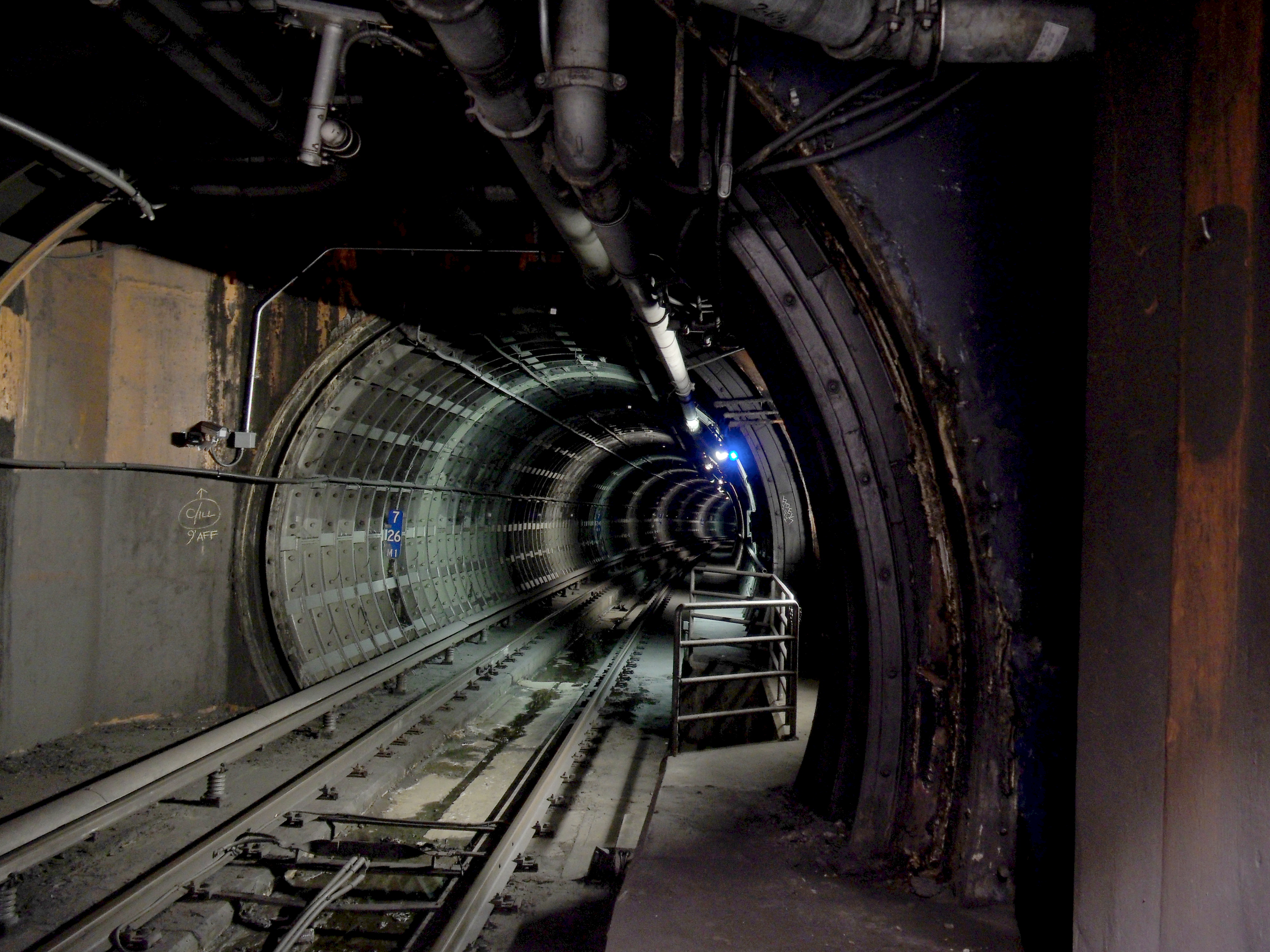
The under-construction Transbay Tube served as the tunnel through which THX escapes.

THX's final climb out to the daylight was filmed (with the camera rotated 90°) in the incomplete (and decidedly horizontal) Bay Area Rapid Transit Transbay Tube before installation of the track supports, with the actors using exposed reinforcing bars on the floor of the tunnel as a ladder. The end scene in which THX stands before the sunset was shot at Port Hueneme, California, by a second unit of photographer Caleb Deschanel and Matthew Robbins, who played THX in this long shot.

After completion of photography, Coppola scheduled one year for Lucas to complete postproduction. Lucas edited the film on a German-made K-E-M flatbed editor in his Mill Valley house by day and Walter Murch edited sound at night, comparing notes as each session ended. Murch compiled and synchronized the sound montage, which includes elements such as the "overhead" voices, radio chatter, and announcements. The bulk of the editing was finished by mid-1970.

On completion of editing, Coppola took it to Warner Bros., the financiers. Studio executives disliked the film and insisted that Coppola provide the negative to an in-house editor, who cut about four minutes of the film prior to release.

== Soundtrack ==
THX 1138

Soundtrack album by Lalo Schifrin
- Released: 1970
- Recorded: October 15–16, 1970
- Studios: The Burbank Studios, Burbank, California, U.S.
- Genre: Experimental
- Length: 55:36

The soundtrack to THX 1138, conducted by Lalo Schifrin, was released in 1970. Recording took place on October 15 and 16, 1970, at the Burbank Studios in Burbank, California.

The soundtrack was not available commercially in any format until February 2003, when it was released in a limited edition on CD by Film Score Monthly, in the 'Silver Age Classics' series.

=== Track listing ===
1. Logo – 00:08
2. Main Title / What's Wrong? – 03:14
3. Room Tone / Primitive Dance – 01:46
4. Be Happy / LUH / Society Montage – 05:06
5. Be Happy Again (Jingle of the Future) – 00:56
6. Source #1 – 05:18
7. Loneliness Sequence – 01:28
8. SEN / Monks / LUH Reprise – 02:44
9. You Have Nowhere to Go – 01:12
10. Torture Sequence / Prison Talk Sequence – 03:42
11. Love Dream / The Awakening – 01:47
12. First Escape – 03:01
13. Source #3 – 03:34
14. Second Escape – 01:16
15. Source #4 / Third Escape / Morgue Sequence / The Temple / Disruption / LUH's Death – 08:31
16. Source #2 – 03:17
17. The Hologram – 00:56
18. First Chase / Foot Chase / St. Matthew's Passion (Bach) (End Credits) – 07:40

== Reception ==
THX 1138 was released to theaters on March 11, 1971, and was a commercial flop, earning $945,000 in rentals for Warner Bros. and an overall loss for the studio. A contemporary survey found seven favorable, three mixed, and five negative reviews.

Roger Ebert of the Chicago Sun-Times awarded the film three stars out of four and wrote, "THX 1138 suffers somewhat from its simple storyline, but as a work of visual imagination, it's special, and as haunting as parts of 2001: A Space Odyssey, Silent Running, and The Andromeda Strain." Gene Siskel of the Chicago Tribune awarded two stars out of four and stated, "The principal problem with this film is that it lacks imagination, the essential component of a science fiction film. Some persons might claim that the world of THX 1138 is here right now. A more reasonable opinion would hold that we are facing the problems of that world right now. Time has passed the film by."

Vincent Canby of The New York Times wrote, "It is not, however, as either chase drama, or social drama, that THX 1138 is most interesting. Rather, it's as a stunning montage of light, color, and sound effects that create their own emotional impact ... Lucas's achievement in his first feature is all the more extraordinary when you realize that he is 25 years old, and that he shot most of the film in San Francisco, on a budget that probably would not cover the cost of half of one of the space ships in Stanley Kubrick's 2001."

Arthur D. Murphy of Variety observed, "Likely not to be an artistic or commercial success in its own time, the American Zoetrope (Francis Ford Coppola group) production just might in time become a classic of stylistic, abstract cinema." Charles Champlin of the Los Angeles Times praised the film as "a stunning deployment of the aural and visual resources of the screen to suggest a fearful new world of tyranny by technology", adding that "Lucas is obviously a master of cinematic effects with a special remarkable gift for discovering the look of the future in mundane places like parking structures and office corridors." Champlin stressed that the "real excitement of THX 1138 is not really the message but the medium — the use of film not to tell a story so much as to convey an experience, a credible impression of a fantastic and scary dictatorship of tomorrow."

Kenneth Turan wrote in The Washington Post, "Fortunately, the film comes over not at all trite but rather as enormously affecting. Lucas obviously believed strongly in this futuristic vision, and the film draws its vitality and unity from his belief, and from the fact that it was not bottled up to meet arbitrary conditions but allowed the free rein necessary to reach completeness." Penelope Houston of The Monthly Film Bulletin commented, "Details of the future society — control panels, monitor screens, soothing TV commercial voices, unshakeably calm robot policemen, the human animal turned automaton in appearance and function, but breaking out into a doomed love affair — are all tolerably persuasive, but in sum total rather a pile-up of predictability. On the Orwellian level of ideas, Lucas' passive new world is too indeterminate to carry enough conviction and, consequently, enough of a menacing charge."

The film has continued to earn critical acclaim and holds an approval rating of 72% on Rotten Tomatoes based on 127 reviews. The consensus reads: "Though narratively obtuse at times, THX 1138 endures as a visually and sonically haunting sci-fi experiment where subdued performances and George Lucas' restrained direction heighten its oppressively dystopian atmosphere." On Metacritic, it has a weighted average score of 75 out of 100 based on eight reviews, indicating "generally favorable reviews".

=== Awards ===
The film received a nomination at the 1971 Cannes Film Festival from the International Federation of Film Critics in the Directors' Fortnight section.

== Versions ==
=== 1967 student film ===
The first version was a 15-minute student film for the USC School of Cinematic Arts titled Electronic Labyrinth: THX 1138 4EB, which won first prize for dramatic film at the National Student Film Festival in New York. It was released as a bonus feature along with the 2004 director's cut release.

=== 1971 studio version ===
The 1971 studio version, distributed to theaters, had five minutes removed (against Lucas' wishes) by Warner Bros. This 81-minute version has never been released in any home-media format.

=== 1977 restored version ===
In 1977, after the success of Star Wars, THX 1138 was rereleased with the footage restored that had been deleted by Warner Bros., but it still failed to achieve popularity. This version was later released in VHS (88 minutes) and LaserDisc (86 minutes) formats.

=== 2004 director's cut ===
The George Lucas Director's Cut includes completely new footage, such as this shot of the factory where THX works.

In 2004, The George Lucas Director's Cut of the film was released. Under Lucas' supervision, the film underwent an extensive restoration and digital intermediate process by Lowry Digital and Industrial Light & Magic (ILM), where the film's original negative was scanned, digital color correction was applied and a new digital master was created. As was the case with the special editions of Star Wars, computer-generated imagery and audio/video restoration techniques were also applied to the film.

At Lucas's request, the previsualization team at Skywalker Ranch worked with ILM throughout mid-2003. The team also executed a single-day shoot to form the basis for new digital visual effects, mostly to expand scenes by extending crowds and adding detail to settings and backgrounds for many scenes.

These changes increased the runtime of the film to 88 minutes. This director's cut was released to a limited number of digital-projection theaters on September 10, 2004, and then on DVD on September 14, 2004. The film was released on Blu-ray on September 7, 2010. With the addition of the added content, the film's MPAA rating was changed from GP (now known as PG) to R for "sexuality/nudity". It is the only film directed by Lucas to carry an "R" rating.

=== Novelization ===
A novelization based on the film was written by Ben Bova and published in 1971. It follows the film's plot closely, with four additions:

- An additional character, Control, is the accountant-like ultimate administrator of the city. Several passages depict the events from his point of view.
- After having sex with LUH 3417, THX 1138 consults a psychologist and admits everything. This psychologist transfers the confession to Control, leading to the overriding mindlock and arrest in the factory.
- LUH 3417's trial and death are depicted first-hand from her point of view and from that of Control.
- Instead of climbing outside to witness a sunset, THX 1138 climbs up and spends the night in the superstructure, and exits in the morning to find other humans living outside.

== Etymology and references ==
The significance of the name THX 1138 has been the subject of much speculation. Lucas chose the letters and numbers for their aesthetic qualities, especially their symmetry. Lucas named the film after his telephone number while in college, 849-1138—the letters THX correspond to the numbers 8, 4, and 9 on the keypad. However, Walter Murch said that he always believed that Lucas intended THX to be "sex", LUH to be "love", and SEN to be "sin". John Lithgow described the title THX 1138 as "reading like a license plate number".

Numerous references to "1138" or "THX 1138" appear throughout Lucas's other films, including the Star Wars franchise; for example, the code name of a stormtrooper in the novelization of A New Hope was changed to "TK 421" in the movie. THX 138 is the license plate number of John Milner's hot rod in American Graffiti. Lucas founded THX Ltd., developer of the "THX" audiovisual reproduction standards.

During the final chase sequence, a voice over the radio can be heard in actor Robert Duvall's car saying, "I think I ran over something. I ran over a Wookiee back there on the expressway."

== See also ==
- List of American films of 1971
- List of cult films
- List of films featuring surveillance
- "Calling All Girls" (Queen song)
- "99" (song), 1979, by Toto
- Utopian and dystopian fiction
