= Bald: The Making of THX 1138 =

- Maggie McOmie's hair cut in Bald
- Directed by: George Lucas
- Starring: George Lucas; Francis Ford Coppola; Robert Duvall; Maggie McOmie
- Distributed by: Warner Bros.
- Release date: 1971
- Running time: 8 minutes
- Language: English

Bald: The Making of THX 1138 is a short film directed by George Lucas and released in 1971 to promote his first feature-length film, THX 1138, released the same year.

The film features a conversation between Lucas and Francis Ford Coppola, producer of THX 1138. They discuss Lucas' vision for the film, including his ideas about science fiction in general and in particular his concept of the "used future" which would famously feature in his film Star Wars. Intercut with this discussion is footage shot prior to the start of production of THX 1138 showing several of its actors having their heads shaved, a requirement for appearing in the film. In several cases the actors are shown being shaved in a public location. For example, Maggie McOmie is shaved outside the Palace of Fine Arts in San Francisco, while Robert Duvall watches a sporting event as his hair is cut off. Another actor, Marshall Efron, who would later play an insane man in the film, cut off his own hair and was filmed doing so in a bathtub.

The film is included as a bonus feature on the 2004 DVD release of The George Lucas Director's Cut of THX 1138 and later the Blu-ray release.

== See also ==
- List of American films of 1971
