= Bald Head (disambiguation) =

Bald Head is headland on the south side of Trinity Peninsula on the Antarctic Peninsula in Antarctica.

Bald Head or Baldhead may also refer to:

== Place ==
- Bald Head River (Newfoundland)
- Baldhead River (Ontario)
- Bald Head, Maine, a village
- Bald Head Island, North Carolina, a village in North Carolina
- Bald Head Light, a lighthouse in North Carolina
- Yokun Ridge or Baldhead, a ridge in Massachusetts
- Mount Baldhead, a peak in Saugatuck, Michigan

== Other ==
- Baldness, the loss of hair
- "Bald Head", song by Professor Longhair

== See also ==
- Skinhead, a subculture
- Bald (disambiguation)
