= Bald Hills =

Bald Hills may refer to:

== Australia ==
- Bald Hills, Queensland, a suburb in Brisbane
- Bald Hills, Victoria, a locality in the Shire of Hepburn

== Canada ==
- Bald Hills range in Jasper National Park

== US ==
- Bald Hill Range in Middlesex County, Connecticut
- Bald Hills, California, former community in Humboldt County, California
- Bald Hills (Humboldt County), a mountain range in Humboldt County, California
- Bald Hills (Lassen County), California
- Bald Hills, Shasta County, California former community

== Fictional places ==
- Bald Hills (Russian: Лысые Горы, Lisiye Gory), the Bolkonsky estate in the novel War and Peace

== See also ==
- Bald Hill (disambiguation)
