= R/bald =

Subreddit about baldness and hair loss

r/bald
- Subreddit icon
- Website type: Subreddit
- Available in: English
- Founder: GeekBro27
- Website: www.reddit.com/r/bald
- Launched: 2011; 15 years ago

r/bald is a subreddit where participants share their experiences with and discuss hair loss. The subreddit was founded in 2011 to be a positive space for bald people, as baldness and aging are frequently criticized on the internet and can negatively affect men's mental health. By early 2026, the subreddit had 360,000 subscribers and over a million weekly visitors. Posts often feature pictures of users shaving their heads (calling it "taking the plunge") or asking commenters whether it is time to do so. The subreddit has been approvingly noted in media for its positivity towards baldness, especially in comparison to how other parts of the internet treat physical appearance.

== Background and history ==
Male-pattern baldness affects up to half of men by the time they are 50 years old, according to a systematic review published in the Journal of Cosmetic Dermatology. Balding is frequently a negative experience for men; baldness often does not conform to masculine beauty ideals, which tend to prize physical attributes closely associated with youth and virility. Anthropologist Adrià Pujol told El País English that media protagonists are often depicted with full heads of hair, while many villains – such as Lex Luthor, Kingpin, and the antagonists of 300 – are depicted as bald. According to an article in Endotext, studies have found that baldness can negatively affect mental health. Oftentimes, men will try to avoid balding; it can be delayed or prevented with medication or surgical interventions, or else hidden with hats or strategic hairstyles. Some bald celebrities, such as Dwayne Johnson, have advocated for a wholesale change in the beauty standard.

GeekBro27, a Redditor who shaved his head as a young adult, started the subreddit r/bald in 2011 to be a positive digital third space for bald people. Initially, he built up the subreddit with "Bald Guy of the Week" posts about various celebrities. By 2024, r/bald had more than 140,000 subscribers and was in the top 2% of subreddits by size, but growth increased substantially when CNN published an article (Note: See Holland 2024.) about the subreddit, and it grew again in late 2025. (Note: García 2026 claims that the growth coincides with an article published by Fast Company, but that article was not published until January 2026. See Upton-Clark 2026.) By early 2026, it had 360,000 subscribers, 1.4 million weekly visitors, and 30,000 new subscribers per week.

== Post ==
Before-and-after photos of an r/bald participant "taking the plunge"

Many participants post before-and-after photos of them "taking the plunge", the subreddit's term for shaving one's head. Others post photos of receding hairlines or hair loss, asking if they should do the same. Those posts are often met with the hand-on-the-shoulder meme from Akakichi no Eleven – edited to remove the characters' hair – meant to signal "it is time to go bald". Otherwise, they will comment "hold". The subreddit is also host to general discussion about baldness, such as scalp care.

Commenters are overwhelmingly supportive of the posters when they share their photos; El País described the subreddit's culture as "an oasis of good vibes", while a New York Times journalist described it as a "rare example of positivity among men online". The subreddit's rules include "treat the hair-headed ones with kindness too", "no bald-bashing", and no advocating hair-restoration. While the subreddit's participants are primarily bald men, women who go bald (primarily due to alopecia or chemotherapy) are also celebrated; a New Statesman article noted that "there is no sexualizing, nor are there comments on their looks or bodies".

== Reception ==
r/bald has been praised in the media for its positivity, especially compared to other parts of the internet. The CNN article praised it for being one of the few "friendly, welcoming corners of the internet", contrasting it with social media's "misogyny, misinformation and algorithm-enhanced maleficence". A HuffPost UK article called it the "one corner of the internet where kindness and praise are at the core of people's interactions" compared to an internet that has become "synonymous with negativity". An article in the New Statesman specifically called out the internet's hostility towards people's appearances, pointing to Facebook's roots in men rating women's looks: "from its very conception, social media has been a place for men to judge others – mostly women". r/bald, by contrast, stood out to the author for its "sheer positivity".
