= Maggie McOmie =

American stage and film actress (born 1941)

- Born: December 29, 1941 (age 84); Yolo County, California, U.S.
- Occupation: Actress

Maggie McOmie is an American stage and film actress, best known for co-starring with Robert Duvall in George Lucas' 1971 film THX 1138. Though the film received mixed reviews at the time, it has since developed a cult following.

== Career ==
McOmie chose not to pursue a film career following THX 1138, which remains her only major film credit, although she returned to the screen in small roles in the 2006 films Grand Junction and The Boston Strangler. Throughout the years, she has remained active in small plays and productions, both in Los Angeles and now in her home of Portland, Oregon. She has a daughter and two grandchildren.

== Filmography ==
- THX 1138 (1971) - LUH
- Grand Junction (2006) - Carol
- The Boston Strangler (2006) - Allison Owens
- Beau Ideal (2026) - Margaret Carver
