= Bald (song) =

Song by The Darkness

from the album One Way Ticket to Hell... and Back
- Released: 2005
- Recorded: 2005
- Genre: Hard rock
- Length: 5:31
- Label: Atlantic
- Songwriters: Justin Hawkins, Dan Hawkins and Ed Graham
- Producer: Roy Thomas Baker

"Bald" is a song by the British rock band The Darkness. It was first released in 2005 on the band's second album One Way Ticket to Hell... and Back. Its the seven track on the album. "Bald" was met with positive reviews.

== Overview ==
"Bald" is a hard rock slow burn song, about going bald. According to Rolling Stone magazine "'Bald' is a hilarious melodrama about a rock god's worst nightmare." In another review, Rolling Stone states that it is "about premature hair loss". Stylus states that it is about "losing your edge". Justin Hawkins commented on it saying "The irony of it is that it's a super-powerful song about losing your virility,"

It is the seventh track in the band's second album One Way Ticket to Hell... and Back, clocking in at five minutes thirty-one seconds, making it the longest song on the album. Lyrical and musical similarities can be noted; for example, the lyric “tonight thank God it’s him instead of me” reflects the famous Band Aid line in question.

"Bald" was recorded at Chapel Studios, South Thoresby, Lincolnshire; Paul Smith Music Studios, London. "Bald" is reputedly about Bono, following a dispute between the lead singer of U2 and Justin Hawkins whilst recording Band Aid 20 in 2004. Both singers recorded the line but Bono was given precedence.

== Release ==
"Bald" has been released in three different albums: On 28 November 2005, on the band's second album One Way Ticket to Hell... and Back. On 1 April 2008, in the first compilation album "The Platinum Collection". On 4 August 2008, in the second compilation album "2 in 1: Permission to Land/One Way Ticket to Hell".

== Critical reception ==
"Bald" was met with very positive reviews. Rolling Stone called it the "best song on the Darkness' eccentrically flawed second album". Pitchfork Media praised it for exploring new territory, but ultimately concluded that "Bald" was undercooked. Drowned in Sound stated "The chorus is sung in the staccato tradition of oddball duo Sparks (whose _‘This Town etc’_ Justin covered on his summer solo release) and the accompanying guitars are of the have-a-go-hero variety. Essentially love on the rocks with no hair."

== Personnel ==
- Justin Hawkins – vocals, lead and rhythm guitar, synthesizer, piano
- Dan Hawkins – rhythm and lead guitar, bass
- Ed Graham – drums

Additional personnel

- Pedro Ferreira – production, mixing, engineering
- Mike Marsh – mastering
- Will Bartle – recording assistance
- Nick Taylor – mixing assistance
