= Lysaya Gora, Perm Krai =

Lysaya Gora Лысая Гора
- Village
- Location within Perm Krai Location within Russia
- Coordinates: 56°28′N 56°15′E
- Country: Russia
- Region: Perm Krai
- District: Chernushinsky District
- Time zone: UTC+5:00

Lysaya Gora (Russian: Лысая Гора) is a rural locality (a village) in Chernushinsky District, Perm Krai, Russia. The population was 21 as of 2010. There are 2 streets.

== Geography ==
Lysaya Gora is located 15 km southeast of Chernushka (the district's administrative centre) by road. Troitsk is the nearest rural locality.
