= Bald Hill (Mendocino County) =

- Location within California Location within the United States

Highest point
- Elevation: 771 ft (235 m)
- Coordinates: 39°28′3.58″N 123°45′23.00″W

Geography
- Location: Mendocino County, California, United States
- Topo map: USGS Fort Bragg

Bald Hill is a hill summit northeast of Fort Bragg, in Mendocino County, California. It elevation is 771 feet/235 meters.
