= Bald Mountain (Washington) =

Mountain in Washington (state), United States

According to the USGS GNIS, the state of Washington in the United States has 15 peaks named Bald Mountain.

Name	USGS link	State	County	USGS map	Coordinates	Elevation	
Bald Mountain		Washington	Okanogan	Ashnola Pass	48°57′13″N 120°15′34″W	7,936 ft	2,419 m
Bald Mountain		Washington	Ferry	Edds Mountain	48°33′33″N 118°30′09″W	6,929 ft	2,112 m
Little Bald Mountain		Washington	Yakima	Old Scab Mountain	46°54′09″N 121°10′00″W	6,096 ft	1,858 m
Bald Mountain		Washington	Kittitas	Manastash Lake	46°57′57″N 120°56′39″W	5,728 ft	1,746 m
Bald Mountain		Washington	Skagit	Sauk Mountain	48°31′49″N 121°35′07″W	5,410 ft	1,650 m
Bald Mountain		Washington	Whatcom	Glacier	48°57′58″N 121°57′40″W	5,387 ft	1,642 m
Bald Mountain		Washington	Snohomish	Silverton	48°06′22″N 121°36′04″W	4,623 ft	1,409 m
Bald Mountain		Washington	Whatcom	Cavanaugh Creek	48°39′02″N 122°01′36″W	4,560 ft	1,390 m
Bald Mountain		Washington	Stevens	Nelson Peak	48°08′51″N 117°35′19″W	4,160 ft	1,270 m
Bald Mountain		Washington	King	Lester	47°14′15″N 121°29′21″W	4,091 ft	1,247 m
Bald Mountain		Washington	Lewis	Newaukum Lake	46°43′50″N 122°27′11″W	3,619 ft	1,103 m
Bald Mountain		Washington	Stevens	Tumtum	47°57′40″N 117°39′02″W	3,383 ft	1,031 m
Bald Mountain		Washington	Skagit	Stimson Hill	48°21′58″N 122°02′42″W	2,461 ft	750 m
Bald Mountain		Washington	Klickitat	Penny Ridge	45°45′13″N 121°30′17″W	1,631 ft	497 m
Bald Mountain		Washington	Clark	Ariel	45°55′09″N 122°34′22″W	1,545 ft	471 m
