= Old Baldy (Nebraska) =

Hill in Nebraska, U.S.

- The Tower
- U.S. National Register of Historic Places
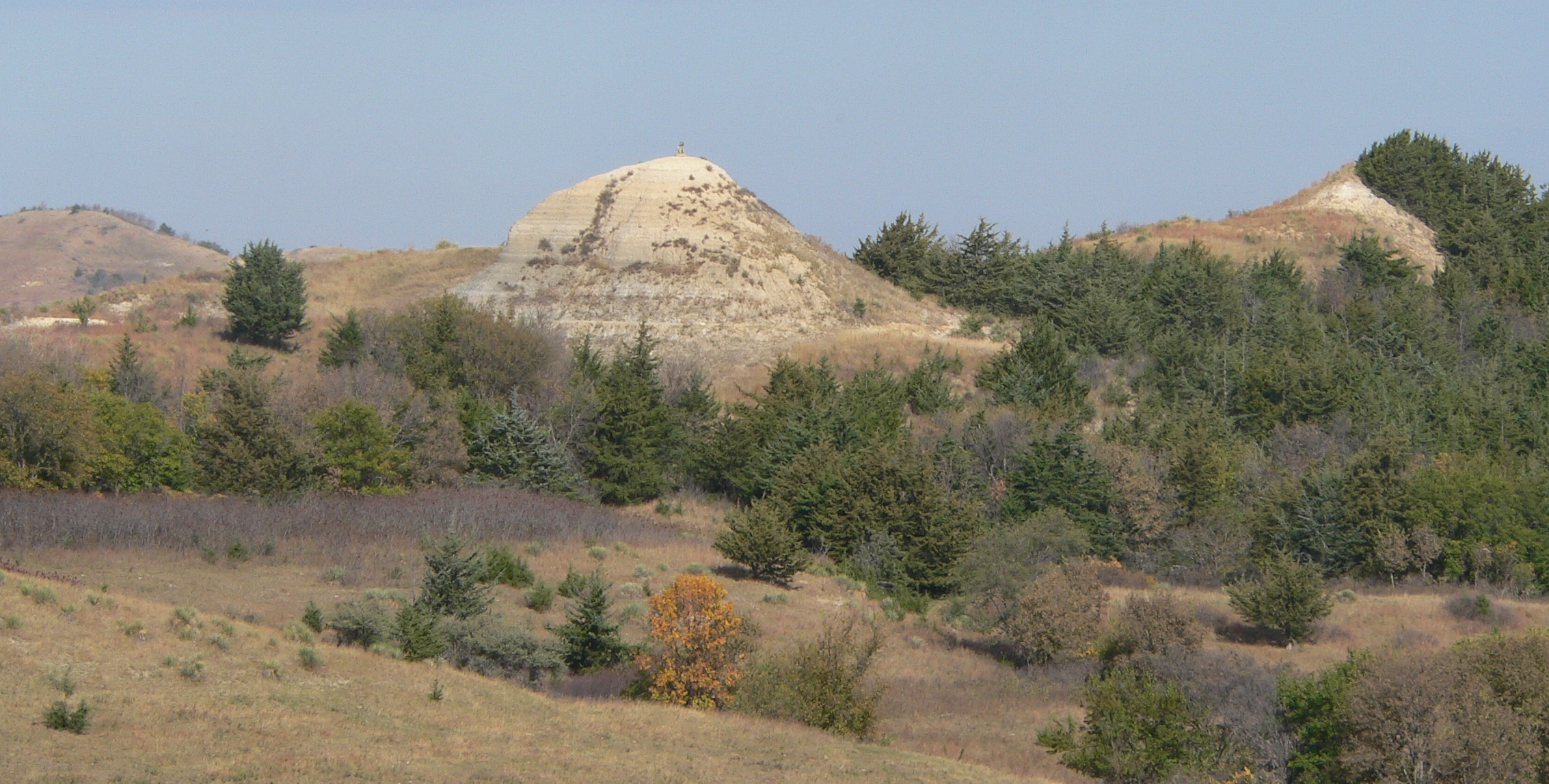
- Old Baldy, seen from the southeast

- Location within Nebraska
- Nearest city: Lynch, Nebraska
- Coordinates: 42°56′09″N 98°28′40″W
- Area: 1,082 acres (438 ha)
- NRHP reference No.: 04001413
- Added to NRHP: December 29, 2004

Old Baldy, also known as the Tower, is a hill located near the village of Lynch, in Boyd County, in the northern part of the state of Nebraska in the Midwestern United States. It was visited by the Lewis and Clark Expedition on their way up the Missouri River in 1804; nearby, they discovered a colony of prairie dogs, an animal previously unknown to scientists.

For its connection with Lewis and Clark, and because it has little changed since their passage in 1804, the site was listed in the National Register of Historic Places in 2004.

== Description ==
Old Baldy is located about 7 miles (11 km) north of Lynch, Nebraska, and about half a mile (about a kilometer) south of the Missouri River. It is part of a line of bluffs at the southern edge of the Missouri valley; it rises an additional 70 feet (21 m) above the surrounding highlands, reaching an elevation of 1,585 feet (483 m) above sea level.

The formation making up the hill is part of the Pierre Shale, deposited in the deep marine waters of the Western Interior Seaway during the Campanian and Maastrichtian ages of the late Cretaceous period, 70–80 million years ago. The Pierre consists chiefly of dark shale, but also contains chalky strata, one of which is exposed at the top of the hill. The chalk does not readily support plant growth, giving the hill its conspicuous bald appearance.

== History ==
For many years before the 1803 Louisiana Purchase, Thomas Jefferson had contemplated seeking a water route from the United States to the Pacific Ocean. With the acquisition of the Louisiana Territory from France, this could be done legally. Jefferson, now President of the United States, accordingly dispatched the Lewis and Clark Expedition up the Missouri River. The party was charged with following the main stem of the river to its headwaters and then finding rivers running westward from the Rocky Mountains to the Pacific. They were also directed to establish peaceable relations with the indigenous peoples of the region; to note mineral and other resources; to map the major physiographic features; and to describe and collect specimens of the flora and fauna of the territory.

On May 14, 1804, the party left its winter quarters at Camp Dubois, near the confluence of the Missouri and the Mississippi River. On July 21, it reached the mouth of the Platte River; on September 4, the mouth of the Niobrara River.

On September 7, 1804, the two captains left the boats to explore the conspicuous bald hill, which they had seen from the river the day before. They climbed to the summit and measured its height as 70 feet (21 m), and its base as 300 feet (91 m).

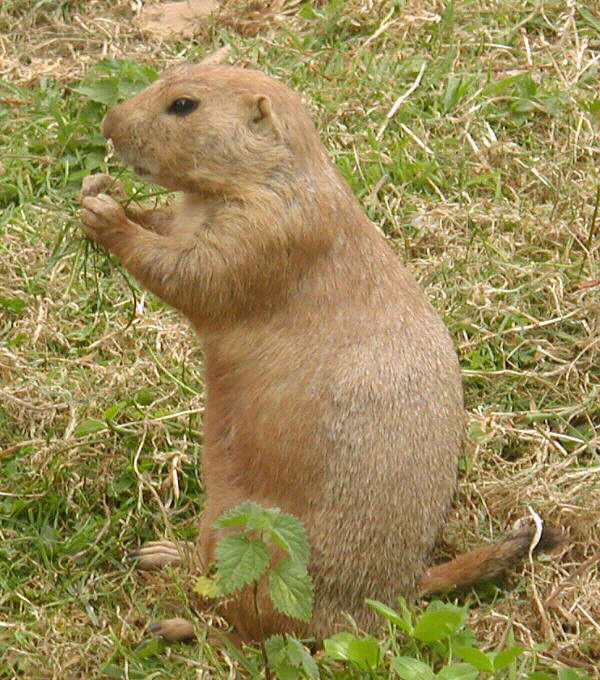
Black-tailed prairie dog

In descending the hill, the explorers discovered a colony of prairie dogs, an animal then unknown to science, though known to French explorers. To secure specimens, Lewis and Clark summoned other members of the party from the boat. They were able to shoot one, "which was cooked for the Capts dinner", but wanted a live animal. An attempt to dig one out of its burrow proved unsuccessful: after digging 6 feet (1.8 m) through hard clay, the men thrust a pole down the hole and discovered that they were less than halfway to the bottom. The party then attempted to flood an animal out, which also proved no small task: "we por'd into one of the holes 5 barrels of water without filling it." Although they worked until nightfall, they only succeeded in flushing out and capturing a single prairie dog.

The prairie dog survived the trip up the river to the expedition's winter camp at Fort Mandan, near the mouth of the Knife River in present-day North Dakota. On April 7, 1805, the expedition's keelboat was dispatched back down the Missouri to St. Louis, carrying a collection of specimens including six living animals: a sharp-tailed grouse, four magpies, and the prairie dog. The grouse apparently died between St. Louis and New Orleans, and three of the magpies did not survive the trip from New Orleans to Baltimore. On October 4, the prairie dog and the surviving magpie were inspected by President Jefferson in Washington, D.C. They were then sent to Charles Willson Peale for his museum in Philadelphia. The prairie dog is known to have survived at least until April 1806.

As a conspicuous and recognizable landmark, Old Baldy was used by surveyors operating in this region of Nebraska and South Dakota. In particular, it was used by Lieutenant J. C. Clark (apparently unrelated to William Clark of the Lewis and Clark Expedition) in an 1860 survey to lay out the boundary of the 96,000-acre (39,000 ha) Fort Randall Military Reservation. In 1948, the United States Coast and Geodetic Survey established a triangulation station named "Lynch" atop a hill located just north of Old Baldy; the northern hill is of about the same height, but is not devoid of vegetation.

== Promotion and protection ==
For communities along the Missouri River in eastern Nebraska, the 2004 bicentennial of the Lewis and Clark Expedition was an opportunity to promote tourism. It was estimated that as many as 40 million people might travel to parts of the Corps of Discovery's route in that year.

The residents of Lynch used the prairie-dog episode as a focus for tourism promotion. Although the animals are generally regarded as pests by farmers and ranchers, it was thought that the story of their discovery might draw visitors specifically to the area. To fund Lewis and Clark-related projects, the city sold stuffed fabric prairie dogs made by local volunteers and dubbed "Lynch Dawgs". A Lynch restaurateur also installed a 4-foot (1.2 m) chainsaw sculpture of a prairie dog outside of his establishment. Tourist promotion of Old Baldy continued after the Lewis and Clark bicentennial.

In 2004, an area of about 1,082 acres (438 ha) including Old Baldy was placed on the National Register of Historic Places under the name "the Tower". The site was nominated for its connection to Lewis and Clark; it was noted that the surrounding prairie and burr oak woodlands were little altered since 1804. In 2005, a conservation easement was purchased covering 524 acres (212 ha) including the hill.

The site is on private land, but can be viewed from an overlook with an interpretive sign off a nearby county road.
