= Bałdy =

- Village
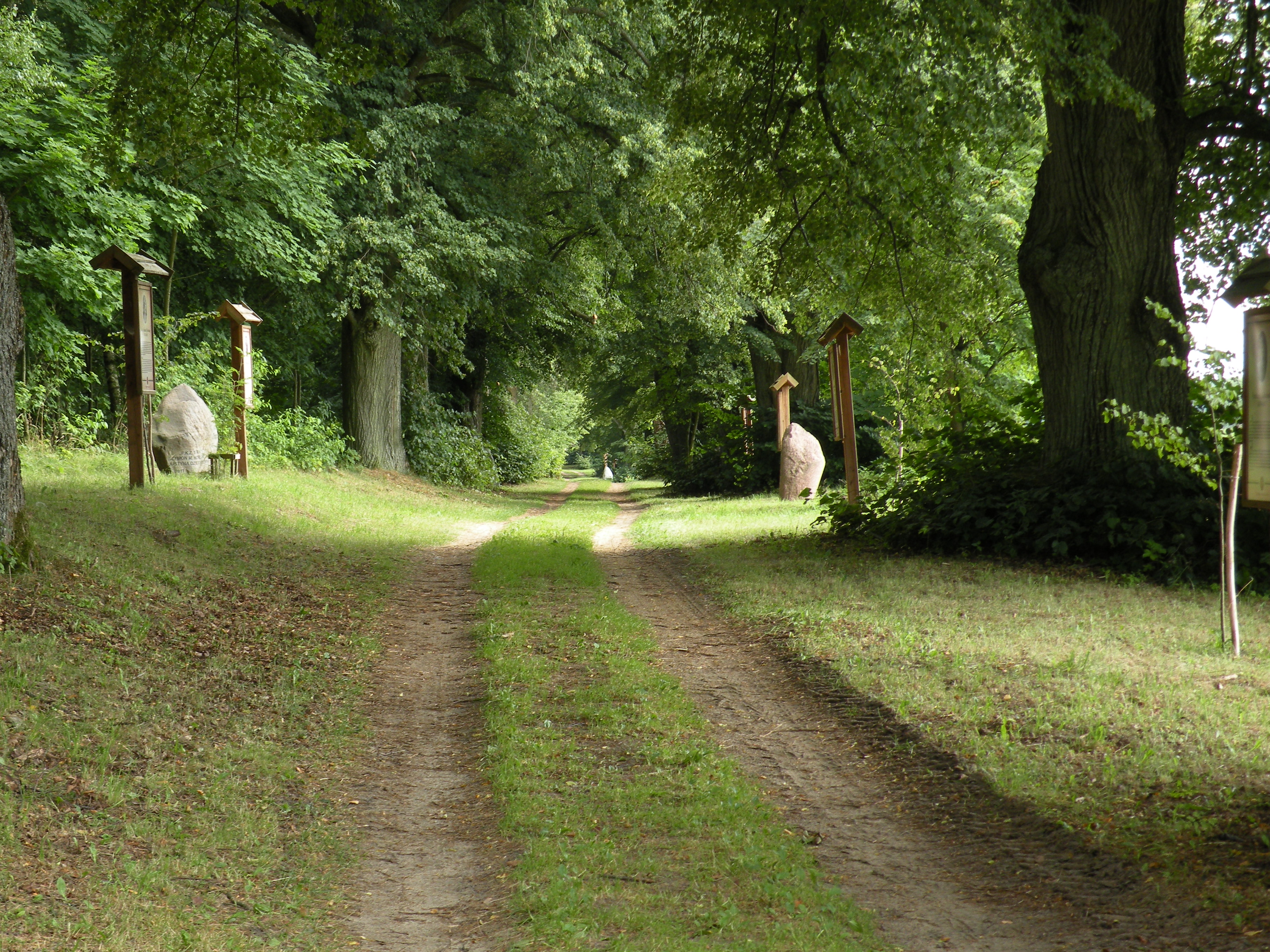
- Bishops' Alley in Bałdy

- Location within Poland
- Coordinates: 53°36′1″N 20°36′14″E
- Country: Poland
- Voivodeship: Warmian-Masurian
- County: Olsztyn
- Gmina: Purda
- Population: 100
- Time zone: UTC+1 (CET)
  - Summer (DST): UTC+2 (CEST)
- Area code: +48 89
- Vehicle registration: NOL

Bałdy [ˈbau̯dɨ] is a village in the administrative district of Gmina Purda, within Olsztyn County, Warmian-Masurian Voivodeship, in northern Poland.

Before 1772 the area was part of Kingdom of Poland, in 1772–1871 of Prussia, in 1871–1945 of Germany, and again of Poland since 1945.

In the early modern period, until the Partitions of Poland, ceremonies of welcoming newly appointed bishops of Warmia took place in Bałdy. Referring to this tradition, there is the Bishops' Alley (Aleja Biskupów) in the village with memorial stones dedicated to all historical bishops of Warmia.

Selected memorial stones in Aleja Biskupów:

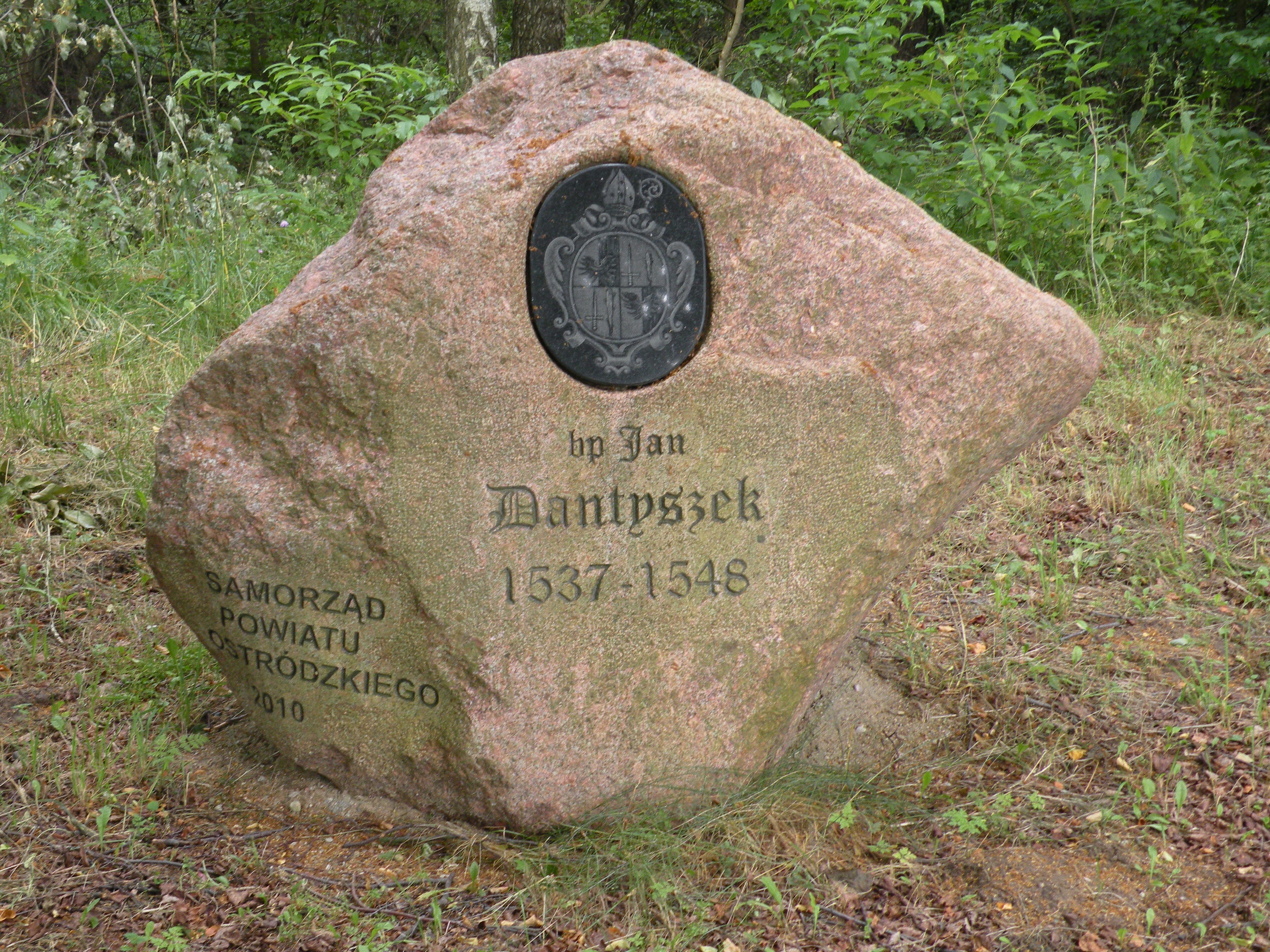
Jan Dantyszek

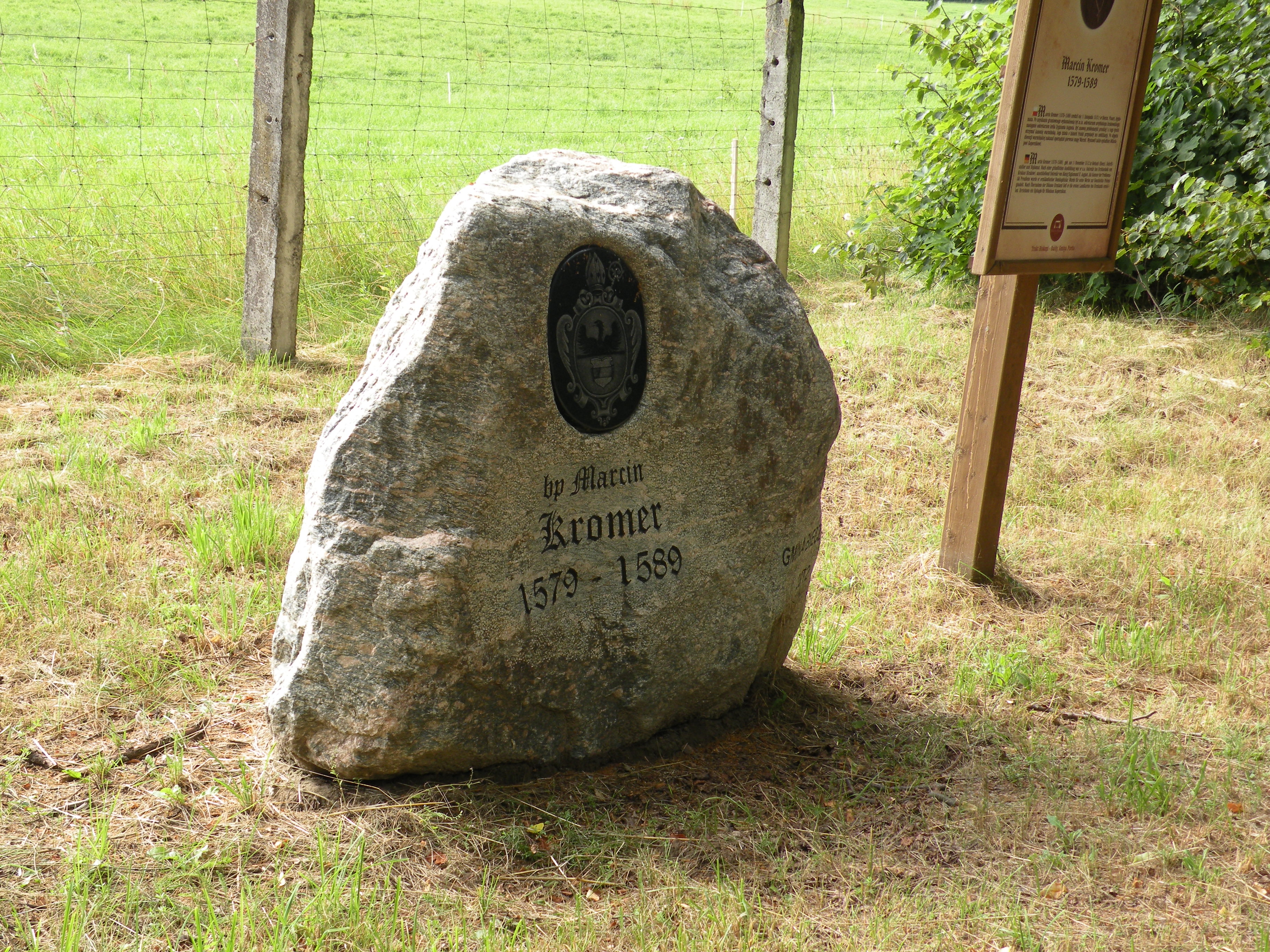
Marcin Kromer

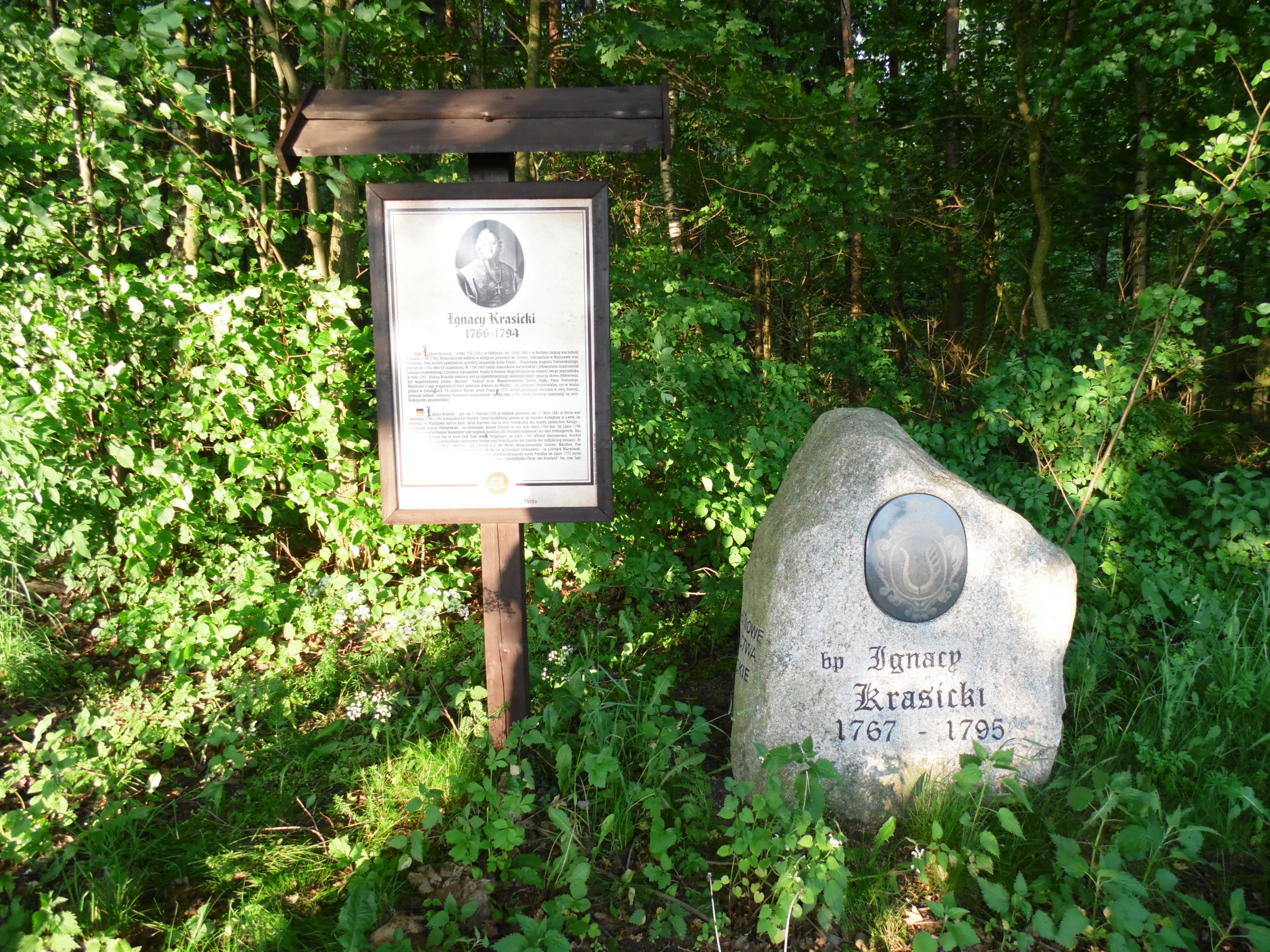
Ignacy Krasicki

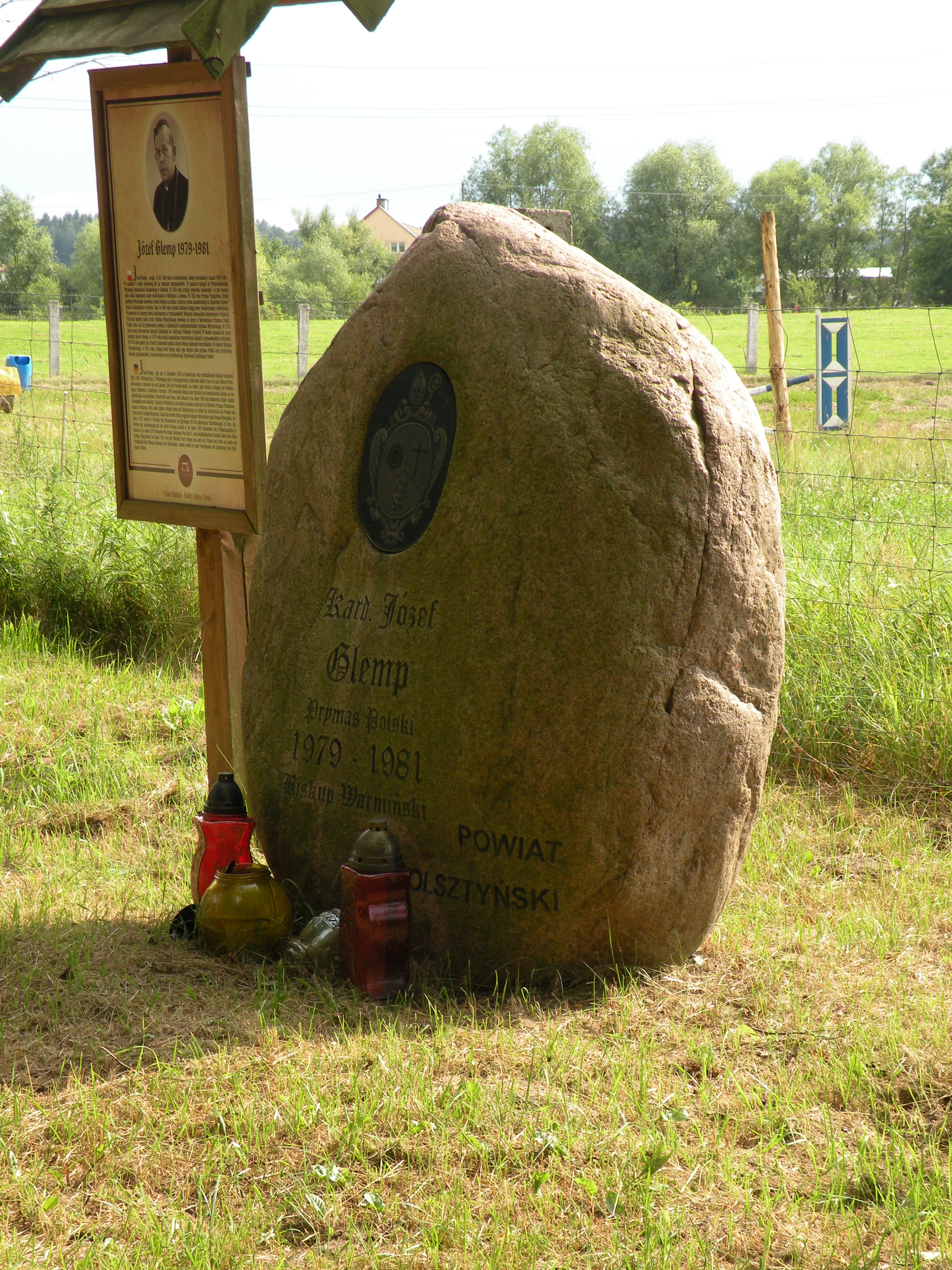
Józef Glemp
