= Lysaya Gora, Vologda Oblast =

Lysaya Gora Лысая Гора
- Village
- Location within Vologda Oblast Location within Russia
- Coordinates: 58°50′N 38°16′E
- Country: Russia
- Region: Vologda Oblast
- District: Cherepovetsky District
- Time zone: UTC+3:00

Lysaya Gora (Russian: Лысая Гора) is a rural locality (a village) in Myaksinskoye Rural Settlement, Cherepovetsky District, Vologda Oblast, Russia. The population was 3 as of 2002.

== Geography ==
Lysaya Gora is located 43 km (27 mi) southeast of Cherepovets (the district's administrative centre) by road. Novaya Svobodka is the nearest rural locality.
