= Bald Hill (Washington County, Missouri) =

Summit the American state of Missouri

Coordinates: 38°04′57″N 90°42′43″W

Bald Hill is a summit in Washington County in the U.S. state of Missouri. It has an elevation of 869 feet (265 m).

Bald Hill was so named on account of a lack of trees on its summit.
