= F. Clever Bald =

American educator (1897-1970)

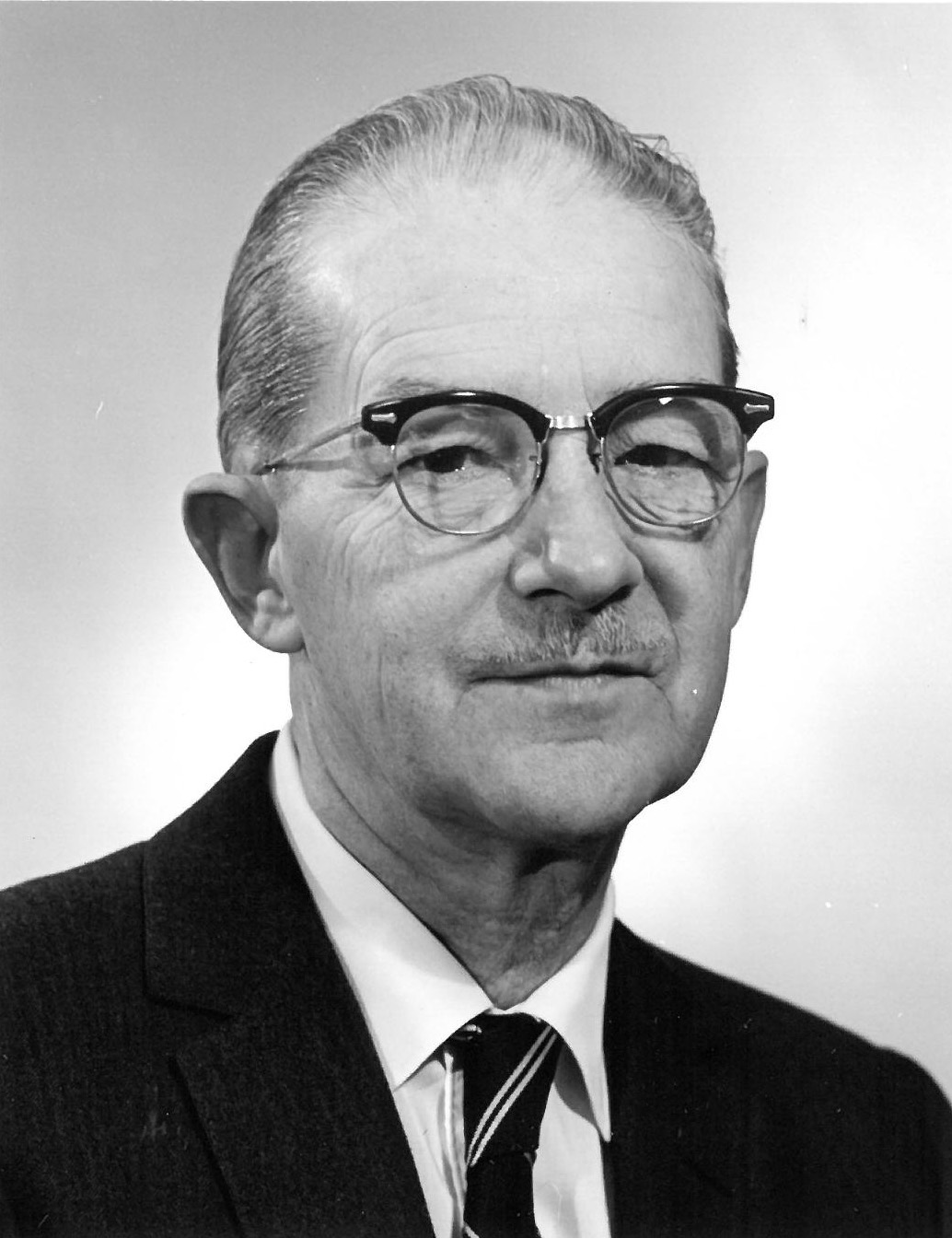
- Born: August 12, 1897; Baltimore, Maryland, U.S.
- Died: December 12, 1970 (aged 73); Boca Raton, Florida, U.S.
- Education: University of Michigan
- Occupation: Historian
- Spouse(s): Laura McGrath, Jane R. Howard
- Children: Robert Edmund

Frederick Clever Bald (August 12, 1897 – December 12, 1970) was an American historian who was an authority on the early history of Michigan and served as director of the Bentley Historical Library at the University of Michigan. Following service in France with an ambulance unit during World War I, Bald completed his college education and embarked on a teaching career in Detroit, Michigan before returning to graduate school to study the history of the Northwest Territory. The subject of his dissertation was Detroit during its first decade under American occupation, subsequently published as Detroit's First American Decade 1796 to 1805. Bald also authored the book Michigan in Four Centuries as well as numerous articles. During World War II, Bald was appointed University War Historian at the University of Michigan, beginning his affiliation with the Michigan Historical Collections, forerunner of the Bentley Historical Library. He served as director of the Michigan Historical Collections from 1960 to 1966.

== Early life ==
Bald was born in Baltimore, on August 12, 1897, to Frederick William and Elizabeth (Krise) Bald. His father was a minister. As a minister's family, the Bald family relocated to serve several different churches. In addition to churches in Maryland, Reverend Bald also administered congregations in Pennsylvania and Michigan.

Bald began his high school education in Mercersburg, Pennsylvania, in 1910 before transferring in 1911 to the Mercersburg Academy, a private boarding school. He graduated from Mercersburg Academy in 1914. His college education began at Franklin & Marshall College located in Lancaster, Pennsylvania in 1914. Service during World War I interrupted his education. In 1917, Bald left Franklin and Marshall to enlist in an ambulance company that was being raised in Lancaster in the summer of 1917.

== Military service ==
Bald's ambulance company was originally designated Ambulance Company 3 of the Pennsylvania National Guard. The company barracks were located in the Phi Sigma Kappa Pi Chapter fraternity house on the campus of Franklin and Marshall College. In September 1917, the company moved to Camp Hancock near Augusta, Georgia for further training. The unit was re-designated as Ambulance Company 111, 103rd Sanitary Train, attached to the 28th Division of the American Expeditionary Force. In May 1918 the company left for Camp Mills in Long Island, New York where they stayed before crossing the Atlantic Ocean and landing in England on June 1. The unit reached France on June 14, 1918. Bald's ambulance unit went into action on July 15, 1918, in the Second Battle of the Marne. He also participated in the Oise-Aisne Offensive, and Meuse-Argonne Offensive. Bald was promoted to private first class in May 1918. Bald was discharged at Camp Dix, New Jersey on July 12, 1919.

== Teaching career ==
Following the conclusion of hostilities in World War I, Bald studied at the University of Aix in France in 1919. He returned to the United States and enrolled in the University of Michigan in the Fall of 1919 where he completed his AB degree in 1920. He received a teacher's diploma in June 1920. Bald's first permanent teaching position was at the Hudson School in Detroit, Michigan, beginning in 1922. He became headmaster at the Hudson School in 1929 and remained in that role until 1932 when he became an instructor at the Detroit Institute of Technology. In 1937 he was promoted to professor at Detroit Institute of Technology, a position he would hold until 1943.

=== Graduate education ===
While continuing to teach in Detroit, Bald enrolled at Wayne University (now Wayne State University) in 1933 and earned an M.A. in history in 1937. At Wayne, he was influenced by Milo Quaife, a noted historian of the Northwest Territory and secretary-editor at the Detroit Public Library's Burton Collection. Bald described Quaife as "the foremost authority on the history of Michigan and the Old Northwest." In 1937 Bald enrolled in the history Ph.D. program at the University of Michigan and continued to pursue his interest in early Michigan history. He earned his Ph.D. in November 1943, writing his dissertation on The First American Decade: Detroit, 1796–1805. His dissertation was published in 1948 by the University of Michigan Press as Detroit’s First American Decade, 1796 to 1805.

== University of Michigan ==
=== University War Historian ===
In 1943, Bald resigned his position at the Detroit Institute of Technology and joined the University of Michigan faculty in July on a temporary appointment as a special instructor to teach history in the wartime Army training programs based on the Michigan campus. His appointment was extended for 1944, and in 1945 he was named the University War Historian, succeeding Howard H. Peckham who had held the position before leaving to direct the Indiana Historical Bureau.

The University War Historian was a position created to collect and preserve documentation relating to the University of Michigan and its contribution to the war effort during World War II. In addition to documenting the campus transformation and military training programs housed on campus, the war historian also encouraged alumni serving in the armed forces to send historic materials to campus, and helped publicize the university's wartime activities. When Bald assumed the war historian position, his salary was paid by the Michigan Historical Collections. The affiliation with the Michigan Historical Collections would shape the remainder of Bald's career. In addition to several published summaries about the University of Michigan during World War II, Bald wrote a lengthy 478 page unpublished history of the university during World War II.

=== Michigan Historical Collections ===
In 1947, Lewis G. Vander Velde, the founder and first director of the Michigan Historical Collections was appointed as chairman of the University of Michigan History Department. In order to ease Vander Velde's administrative responsibilities, Bald was made associate director of the Michigan Historical Collections. Bald became the second director of the Michigan Historical Collections in 1960 following the retirement of Vander Velde. Bald retired as director in 1966.

=== Michigan history courses ===
A lecturer for the History Department and adviser to graduate students in his field of interest, Bald offered a two semester course on Michigan history covering Michigan up to statehood in 1837, and Michigan since 1837. A home study course on Michigan history was prepared by Bald and offered through the university's Extension Service Correspondence Study Department. At the beginning of the 1960–61 academic year, Bald was appointed professor of history. Upon his retirement, Bald was named professor emeritus and director emeritus.

== Professional associations ==
Active in numerous organizations, Bald was a trustee and president of the Michigan Historical Society, vice president of the Algonquin Club of Detroit, and Vice President of the Washtenaw County Historical Society. He was appointed a member of the Michigan Civil War Centennial Commission in 1961, and chaired the publications committee. Bald also held membership in the American Historical Association, Mississippi Valley Historical Association, American Association for State and Local History and the Michigan Academy of Science, Arts, and Letters.

== Personal life ==
On August 18, 1921, Bald married Laura M. McGrath. Their son Robert Edmund Bald was born June 14, 1923, and died February 27, 1994, in Ridgewood, New Jersey. Bald's first wife died at the age of 55 on November 2, 1953. He married Jane R. Howard (the former Mrs. Sumner Stone Howard) on December 27, 1956.

Following his retirement from the University of Michigan in 1967 the Balds moved to Boca Raton, Florida. Bald died in Boca Raton on December 12, 1970.
