= Clifford H. Baldowski =

American cartoonist (1917–1999)

Clifford H. Baldowski (1917–1999), known professionally as Baldy, was an editorial cartoonist for the Augusta Chronicle, Miami Herald, and Atlanta Constitution who drew thousands of editorial cartoons under the name "Baldy".

Baldowski, originally from Augusta, began his drawing career in 1946 by submitting his cartoon drawings into The Augusta Chronicle editorial page. He started out in this job, as only a part-time employee. Soon after, he was hired on as a permanent full-time employee in which he developed the name his nickname "Baldy".

Baldy later began working for the Miami Herald where he was very successful in his drawings. In 1950, he joined the staff of the Atlanta Constitution where he continued his work for 32 years. Baldy retired in 1982. His works were published in newspapers all across the United States, Canada, and in the English-language newspapers in Rome and Paris.

Baldy's cartoons appeared in the Time, Newsweek, and the U.S. News & World Report.
