= Bald! =

2003 British television documentary

Bald! is a "fly-on-the-wall" documentary about baldness, broadcast on Channel 4 in the United Kingdom in April 2003. The show followed a number of men as they tried to hold back the advancement of hair loss, and the methods that they tried to cope with the problem.

== Methods shown in the show ==
=== Spray-on hair ===
The first method shown in the programme was 'Spray-on Hair' which was used by a 28-year-old man called Russell. The product is a coloured hair spray which is applied to existing hair follicles making them appear thicker, covering up thinning and bald patches. Effectively giving the impression of a full head of hair, it was not shown to work successfully on the programme. By the end, Russell confirms he has now accepted his hair loss and gives advice and support to other men suffering from it.

=== Lotions and laser treatment ===
The subsequent method featured was laser treatment, with a man named Ian who was having a year's course. Ian was also shown in the programme using a number of hair-restoring lotions, such as minoxidil (commonly known by the name Regaine).

=== Hair graft ===
Next, a man named Lee was shown undergoing his second round of surgery, in which follicles from the back of his head were excised, and then grafted to the bald patch on top.

=== Hair replacement ===
The fourth segment of the programme showed a top hairdresser called James, who has a number of hair strands embedded into a small piece of skin-like material, that was integrated over his bald patch and in between his own hairs.

== Reception ==
According to The Scotsman television critic Sarah Dempster, Bald aimed to present a lighthearted take on baldness but failed to do that as the bald men in the premiere had negative emotions that spanned from slight annoyance to deep despair. Jim Seton of the West Lancashire Evening Gazette said that as he had begun balding in the first few years of his 20s, he found the show to be "essential viewing". David Chater of The Times called the show "an exhaustive study of bald men", while Nicola Mostyn of The Bolton News thought the show was "incredibly fascinating".
