= Robert Bald =

- Robert Bald, painted by Sir John Watson Gordon
- Born: 1776; Culross, Perthshire (now Fife), Scotland
- Died: 1861 (aged 84–85); Clackmannanshire
- Parent: Alexander Bald
- Engineering career
- Discipline: Civil; Mining
- Institutions: Royal Society of Edinburgh; Society of Antiquaries of Scotland; Geological Society of London; Institution of Civil Engineers; Highland and Agricultural Society of Scotland; Wernerian Natural History Society; Royal Caledonian Horticultural Society; Royal Scottish Society of Arts; Association for the Promotion of Fine Arts in Scotland; Society of Scottish Land Surveyors
- Projects: Göta Canal; Geological Map for Scotland; A General View of the Coal Trade in Scotland (1808)

Robert Bald FRSE FSA MWS (4 December 1776 – 28 December 1861) was a Scottish surveyor, civil and mining engineer, and antiquarian. Robert Bald was one of the earliest and most eminent mining engineers and land surveyors in Scotland, and by the late nineteenth century he was referred to as "the acknowledged father of mining engineering in Scotland".

== Early life ==
He was born in Culross, Scotland, the son of Alexander Bald (1753–1823), a colliery agent of Alloa. His brother was Alexander Bald, poet and friend of James Hogg.

== His life ==
=== The engineer ===
Robert Bald apprenticed to his father Alexander, the superintendent and manager of the Mar collieries. (Note: Alexander Bald wrote The farmer and corn dealer's assistant; or, The knowledge of weights and measures made easy, by a variety of tables (1780), which was an indispensable volume for Scottish tenant farmers, a part of Adam Smith’s library, and has proved a useful record of Scottish grain prices in more recent economic history.) The pair can be seen as forming 'something of a "school" of viewers', and a Scottish equivalent of the Buddle family of viewers of northern England. He combined two qualities vital for colliery direction: a deep practical knowledge with a respect for scientific enquiry (he contributed to the Edinburgh Philosophical Journal among other learned publications). Bald seems to have begun his consultative work around the turn of the century, by 1805 his advice was in great demand throughout Scottish coalfields, and he was called upon by both parties of dispute in court and by judges. In 1808 Bald travelled with Thomas Telford (1757–1834) to survey the Göta Canal from Lake Mälaren (Stockholm) to the lakes of Vänern and Vättern in central Sweden. He returned to the country in 1826 when he was invited by the Swedish councillor of state, Baltzar von Platen, to survey the Skanian coal fields, which he did in the company of Sven Nilsson.

Between 1808 and 1825, Bald published reports (NAS ref. CB27) on the mineral deposits, workings, buildings and drainage at collieries across Scotland. One of Bald's earliest publications was A General View of the Coal Trade in Scotland (1808), which is considered "an excellent technical account of coal mining during the Industrial Revolution", the book was reprinted in 1812 with the addition of "An Inquiry into the Conditions of Women who carry Coals under Ground in Scotland, known by the name of Bearers", in which he denounced this labour as a form of slavery. In 1812 David Brewster commissioned Bald to write the 'mine' entry for the 'Edinburg Encyclopaedia', a task that involved visiting the colliery at Killingworth where George Stephenson had introduced a steam-powered machine for raising coal from the pit face. In 1825 he and Stevenson drew up plans for the improvement of Alloa dock, which included the creation of a wet dock and swivel bridge. Apart from the construction of a stone pier, these plans were never executed.

Alongside Stephenson, (Note: A picture of Bald was included in Robert Stevenson’s testament at his death.) he was friends with the botanists Patrick Neill and George Walker-Arnott. Bald was elected a member of the Royal Society of Edinburgh in 1817 and started working in general practise as a mining engineer in Edinburgh around 1820 with John Geddes. Bald and John Buddle share the credit for being the first to direct attention to the dangerous, highly flammable nature of coal dust. Bald pointed out the danger of the ignition of coal dust in a paper in Jameson's Journal, 1828. Bald was a cousin of William Bald (1789–1857) the civil engineer and cartographer, and acted as sponsor for William's membership of the Royal Society in 1829.

Bald had enormously broad range of interests, visible in the large number of learned societies he was a member of and in the subjects on which he wrote. These range from articles and letters on mining engineering, palaeontology and archaeology, marine steam propulsion and metallurgy.

=== The reformer ===
For much of his life, Bald was employed by the Earls of Mar to manage collieries in Alloa, he used his position to try to improve the harsh working and living conditions of the miners and their families. First, working with John Francis Erskine, 23rd Earl of Mar, he condemned the practice of employing women and girls underground in the coal mines. 'In 1822 I tried to stop the employment of women and children as coal bearers, but the women had no other work so there was a great deal of hardship.' Together they started Friendly Societies to offer miners the opportunity to save money, they gave a small pension to retired miners, and set up a court system where miners could deal with their problems and settle differences between themselves.

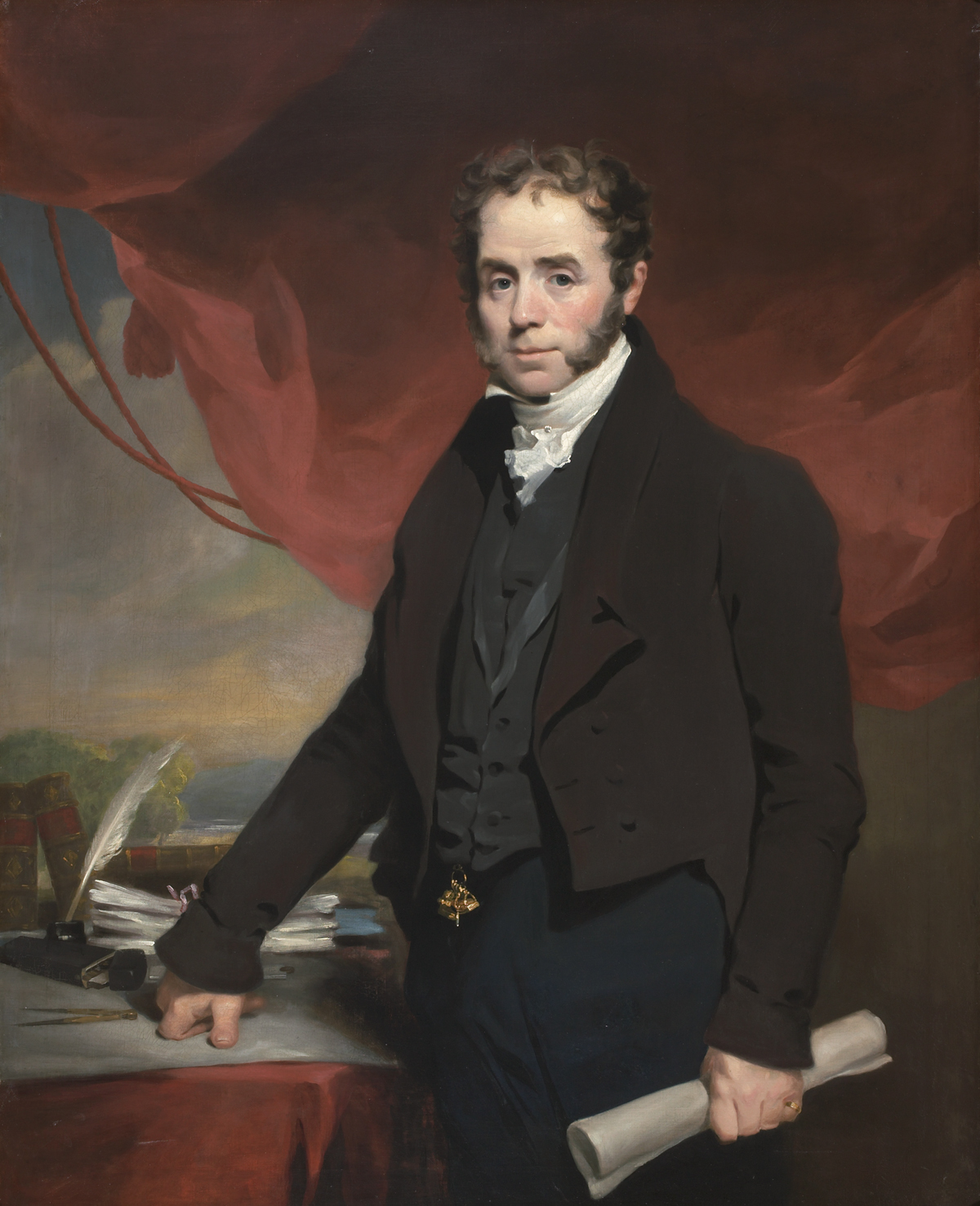
Robert Bald by John Graham-Gilbert

After the death of the colliery manager Alexander Bald, in 1823, the Earl handed over the running of collieries to trustees on the behalf of his family. This left Robert Bald and Robert Jameson, the estate factor, directing the pits by the time of the Earl's death in 1825. Bald's instincts to reform were allowed fuller rein once he gained control of the collieries. Bald's first efforts involved increasing housing accommodation, removing ash pits and sweeping of streets at the trustees expense. He then gave lectures on 'Order and Cleanliness', this was followed by a set of rules printed and circulated to miner's households including exhortations to wash their houses weekly, whitewash them yearly, keep streets clean and included proscriptions against keeping animals inside. A scheme to inspect miner's cottages was prevented by vocal outrage of miner's families. Bald's efforts reached a climax in the summer of 1832 during a cholera outbreak in Alloa, Collyland and New Sauchie. He issued a pamphlet ascribing the disease to God's wrathful judgement on the drunkenness of the miners, especially at the wakes (or dregies) taking place after the funerals for victims of the disease. Additionally, Bald supplied wine as an alternative to the whisky he thought was so damaging, had watchmen patrol the streets looking out for drunkenness, and introduced prayer meetings Alloa, New Sauchie and Collyland collieries.

These reforms angered the miners, who stayed away from work. Bald's employer, John Francis Miller Erskine, 25th Earl of Mar, was forced to appeal to his zealous manager, who offered to either resign or take full responsibility for the running of the collieries when the lease expired in 1835. Bald took over the running of the Collyside, Woodlands and Devonside collieries according to his philanthropic principles, while a group of businessmen ran the Alloa colliery. Eventually, his business partners became concerned about his methods and withdrew from the venture, the collieries then passed into the hands of the men who ran the Alloa colliery. Bald's reputation for labour relations is somewhat equivocal; his aims may have been sound, but his methods were not so popular. Bald was a firm supporter of the Earl of Shaftesbury's Mines and Collieries Bill of 1842 that prohibited the employment of women and girls in mines and sought to regulate the employment of boys and improve safety conditions in the mines. Testimony of female coal bearers he had collected in 'An Inquiry into the condition of those women who carry coals underground in Scotland, known by the name of Bearers' (1808) had been used in the Children's Employment Commission earlier that year. Bald's obituary published in The Gentleman's Magazine, wrote that alongside Lord Ashley, the Earl of Shaftesbury, he did much to stop the employment of women 'bearers' in mines and to generally improve the condition of the mining community.

Bald was also one of more than 2,000 people who met at the West Church in 1838 to campaign for the abolition of the system of apprenticeship in the West Indies. The meeting attendees included the Lord Provost and other city dignitaries, as well as those connected with the Emancipation Society. Bald is reported as seconding the first resolution against the evils of apprenticeship, which was called for the abolition of a system that was but slavery under another name.

=== The mentor ===
In 1808 Bald mentored Francis Benjamin Hall, civil engineer and later acted as a mentor for the teenaged James Nasmyth, engineer and inventor of the steam hammer, introducing him to noted engineers and taking him on trips to engineering sites. Nasmyth mentions Bald in his autobiography:

“His sound judgment and long practical experience in regard to coal-mining and the various machinery connected with it, rendered him a man of great importance in the northern counties, where his advice was eagerly sought for. Besides his special knowledge, he had a large acquaintance with literature and science. He was bright, lively, and energetic. He was a living record of good stories, and in every circle in which he moved he was the focus of cheerfulness. In fact, there was no greater social favourite in Edinburgh than Robert Bald.”

== Home ==
The Edinburgh Post Office Directory of 1832-33 gives the address of "Robert Bald esq, mining engineer" as 17 York Place.

== Death ==
Bald died unmarried in Alloa on 28 December 1861.

== Bibliography ==
- A General View of the Coal Trade of Scotland Inquiry Chiefly that of the River Forth and Mid-Lothian to which is added, an Inquiry into the Conditions of Women who carry Coals under Ground in Scotland, known by the name of Bearers. With an Appendix in which a review of the Trade is taken to the present period, since the treatise was first published in 1808; and a statement given of the steps lately taken by government, with the view of placing the coal trade under an exercise: the effects of which are fully considered. (Edinburgh: Oliphant, Waugh and Innes. 1812)
- 'An Enterprising Family: The Balds of Alloa', by Isabel Grant Stewart
- James Nasmyth: Engineer, An Autobiography
- The Emergence of the Professional Manager in the Scottish Coal Industry, 1760–1815, Baron F. Duckham. The Business History Review, Vol. 43, No. 1 (Spring, 1969), pp. 21–38
- A Biographical Dictionary of Civil Engineers in Great Britain and Ireland. A. W. Skempton
