= Bald Hills (Lassen County) =

- Location within California

Highest point
- Elevation: 1,749 m (5,738 ft)

Geography
- Country: United States
- State: California
- District: Lassen County
- Range coordinates: 40°43′26.618″N 120°46′12.847″W
- Topo map: USGS Spalding Tract

The Bald Hills are a mountain range in Lassen County, California.
