= Bald Hill, Limestone County, Texas =

Ghost town in Texas, US

Coordinates: 31°46′26″N 96°33′16″W

Bald Hill is a ghost town in Limestone County, Texas, United States. Situated on Farm to Market Roads 27 and 638, it had 75 residents and 3 businesses in 1942, as well as a school by 1946. It was abandoned by 1984.

Bald Hill is likely named for a summit of the same name in Limestone County, which peaks at 610 feet (186 meters).
