= Alexander Bald =

British poet

Alexander Bald (9 June 1783 – 21 October 1859) was a Scottish poet.

Bald was a poet and frequent contributor to The Scots Magazine. As the 'father' of the 'Shakespeare Club of Alloa', he became a friend and correspondent with the poets James Hogg (the club's 'laureate', who wrote Ode to the Genius of Shakespeare for the club) and John Grieve (who introduced Hogg to Bald in 1803), and the housepainter-poet John Crawford. Hogg's poem The Good Man of Alloa was composed while visiting Bald at his home and he features in Hogg's story Some Passages in the Life of Colonel Cloud that featured in Blackwood's Magazine in 1825. In the story, Colonel Cloud travels with the narrator to the annual Shakespeare Festival at Alloa, there they meet 'Mr Alexander Bald'.

After working as the agent for the Alloa Colliery, Bald ran the Alloa Brick and Tile Works from 1814. His two best known poems feature in The Modern Scottish Minstrel, Volume V. by Charles Rogers (1857) and three others are found in The Poets of Clackmannanshire by James Beveridge (1885). Alexander Bald was the brother of Robert Bald, the engineer.

== Bibliography ==
- The Modern Scottish Minstrel, by Charles Rogers
- The Clackmannanshire Poets, by James Beveridge.
