= Bald Mountain (Michigan) =

Mountain in Michigan, United States

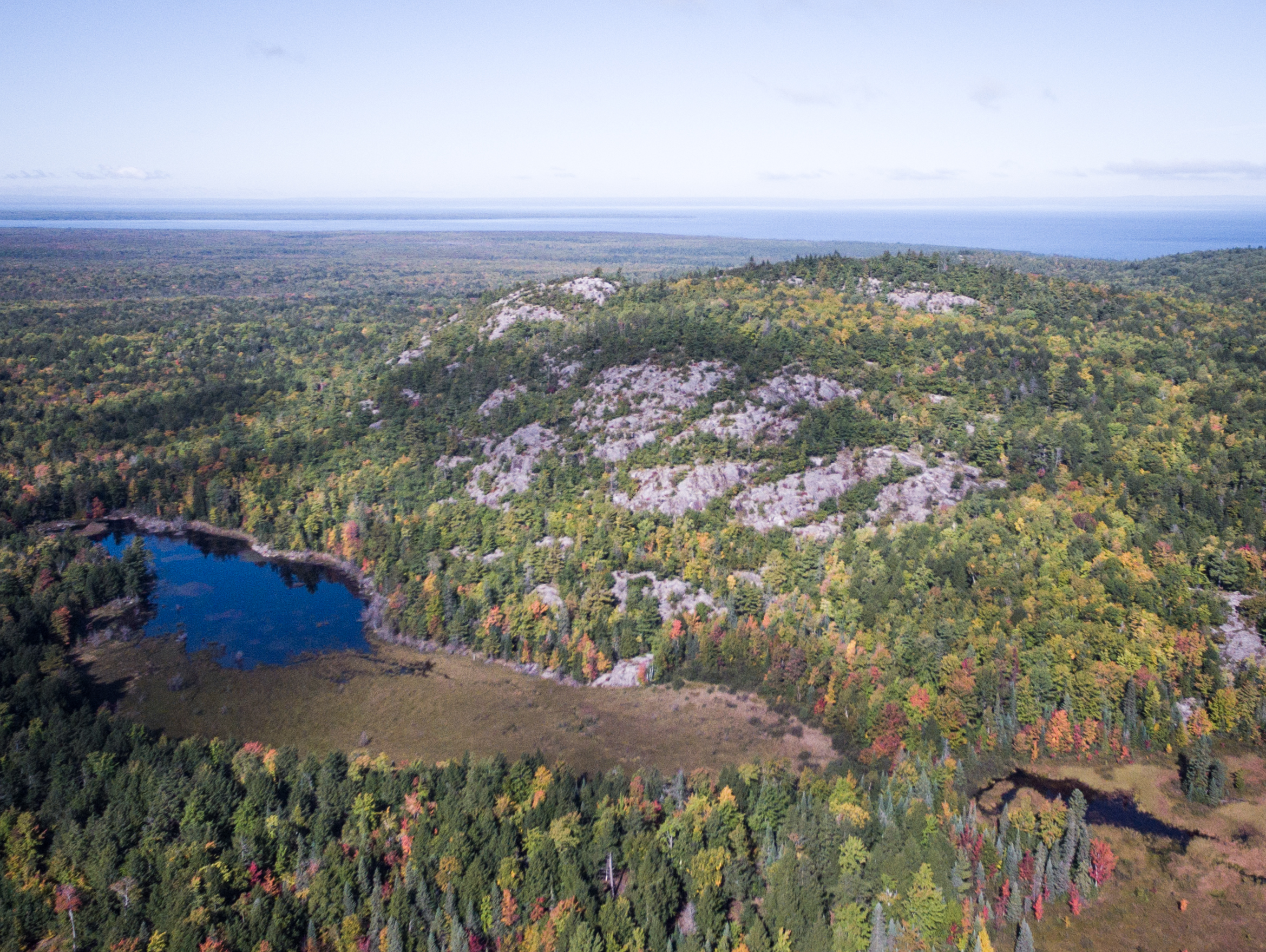
- Looking Northwest over Bald Mountain and Lake Superior

Highest point
- Elevation: 1,184 ft (361 m)
- Coordinates: 46°52′58″N 88°02′20″W

Geography
- Location within Michigan
- Location: Marquette County, Michigan, U.S.
- Parent range: Huron Mountains
- Topo map: USGS Glovers Corner

Bald Mountain, located in the Upper Peninsula of Michigan, is one of several bare rock summits of the Huron Mountain range. It is on the border of Marquette County and Baraga County, but most of the summit resides in Marquette County. It rises about three miles (4.8 km) south of Lake Superior (elevation 591 ft; 180 m).

Bald Mountain is an outlier of the Huron Mountain range, as it is farther west than most of the other rocky summits. Other outliers on the opposite, eastern side of the range include Hogsback Mountain and Sugarloaf Mountain. It is currently privately owned, but is administered under the CFA program. The surrounding area is being actively logged in 2017.

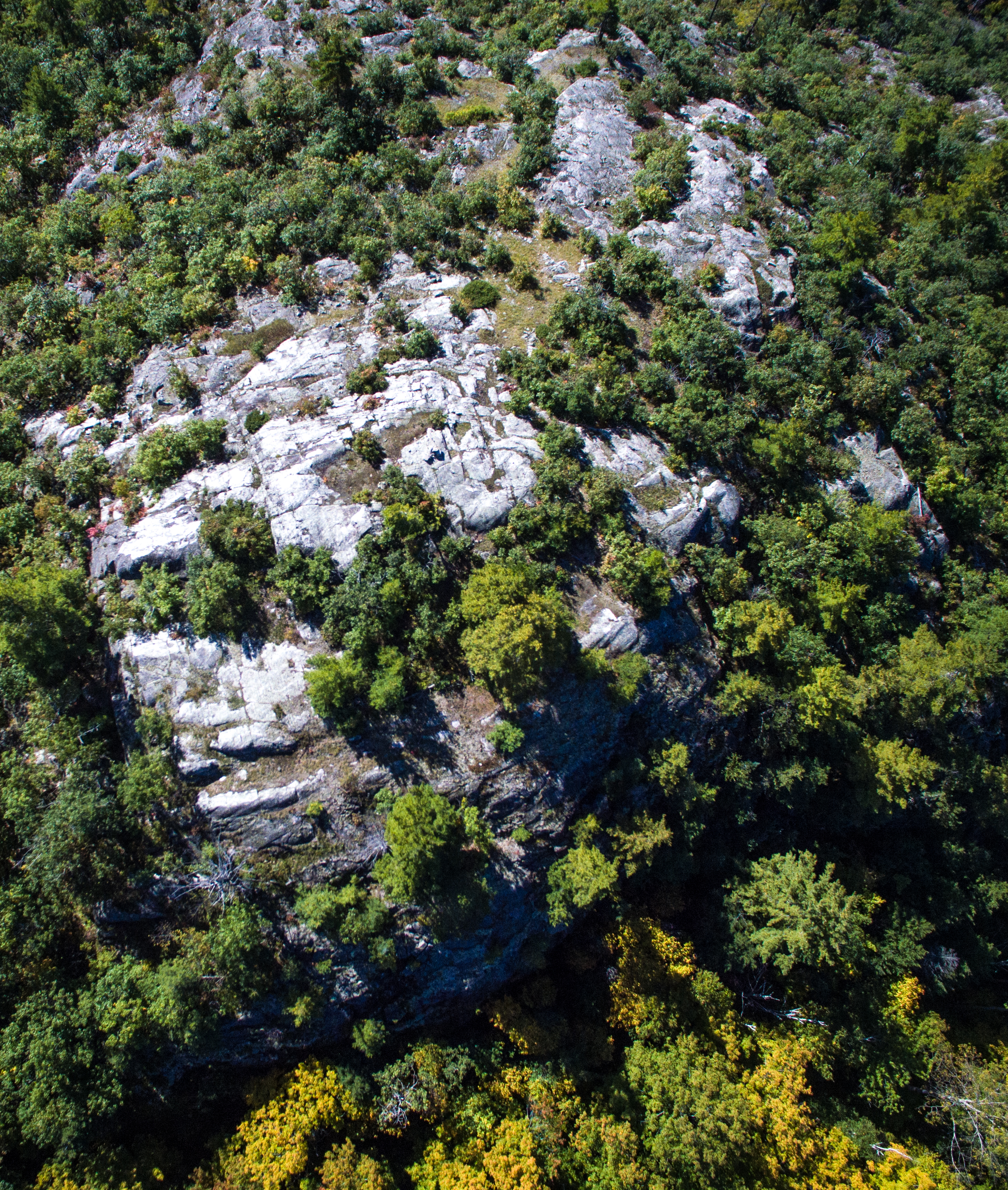
Summit of Bald Mountain (Michigan)

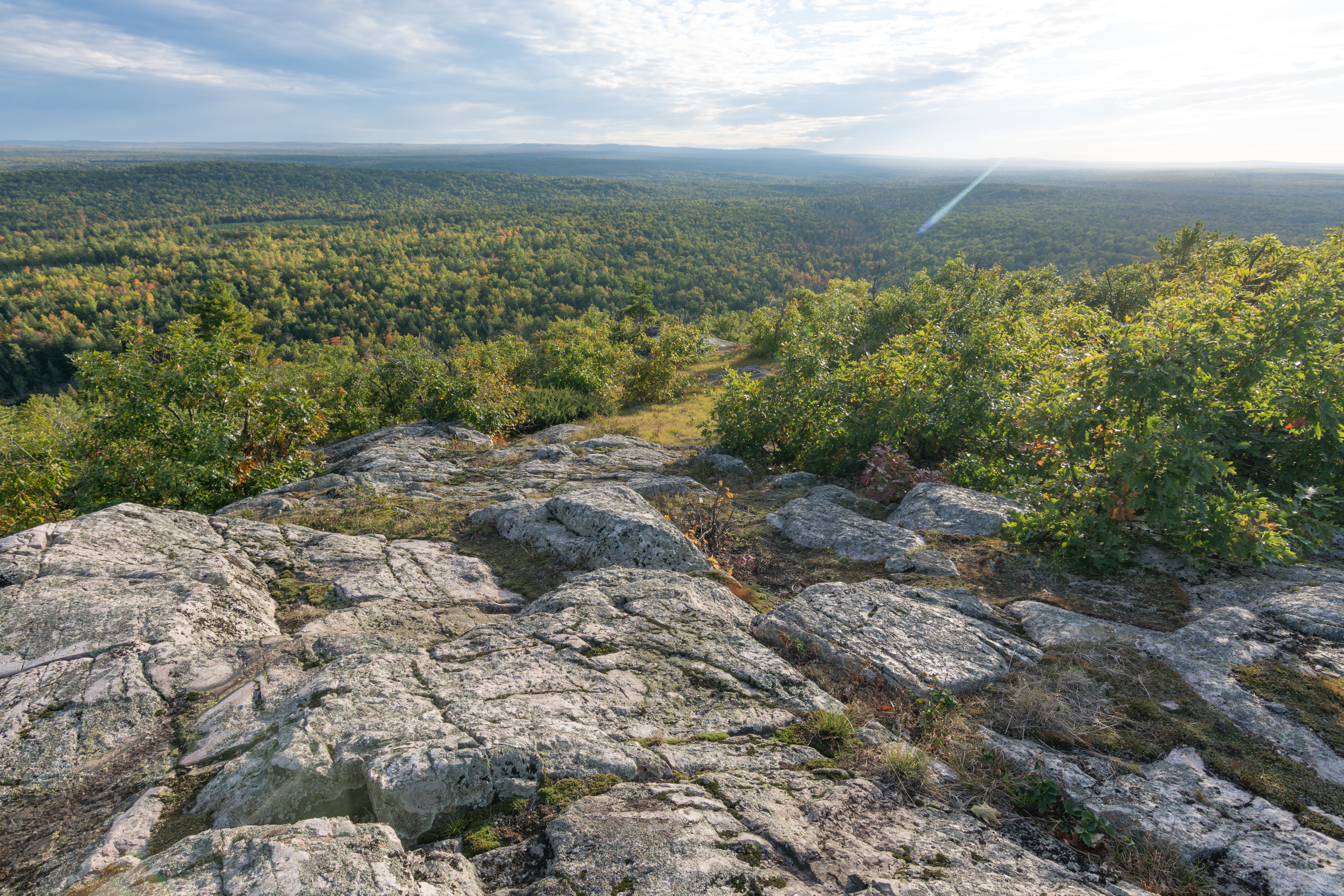
View from summit of Bald Mountain (Michigan)

== See also ==
- Outline of Michigan
- Index of Michigan-related articles
- List of U.S. states by elevation
