= Bald Mountain (Lewis County, New York) =

Mountain in Lewis County, New York, United States

- Location within New York Adirondack Park Location within the United States

Highest point
- Elevation: 1,647 feet (502 m)
- Coordinates: 44°01′17″N 75°11′27″W

Geography
- Location: N of Oswegatchie Camp, Lewis County, New York, U.S.
- Topo map: USGS Oswegatchie SW

Bald Mountain is a 1,647-foot-tall (502 m) mountain in Lewis County in the state of New York. It is located north of Oswegatchie Camp in the town of Croghan. In 1919, a 47-foot-tall (14 m) steel fire lookout tower was built on the mountain. Due to increased use of aerial detection, the tower was closed at the end of the 1970 season. The tower was later knocked over by the private owner due to liability concerns. The public can visit the site, but due to no tower there is no view.

== History ==
In May 1911, the Conservation Commission built a wood fire lookout tower on the mountain. In 1919, the Conservation Commission replaced it with a 47-foot-tall (14 m) Aermotor LS40 steel tower. Due to the increased use of aerial fire detection which was better, the tower was closed at the end of the 1970 season. Ownership of the tower was later transferred to the owner Diamond International. The company had the leg bolts removed and the tower pulled over and left at the site, due to liability concerns. In 1989, a new owner of the 18,000-acre tract entered into an agreement with the New York State Department of Environmental Conservation, where the State purchased the development and recreation rights but left the land itself and the timber in private ownership. The public can visit the site, but due to no tower there is no view.
