= Bald Mountain Brook =

Location
- Country: United States
- State: New York

Physical characteristics
- Mouth: Lake Rondaxe
  - location: NW of Old Forge, New York
  - coordinates: 43°45′23″N 74°54′57″W
  - elevation: 1,719 ft (524 m)

Bald Mountain Brook is a stream located in New York, in the Town of Webb in Herkimer County, northeast of Old Forge.
