= Bald Mountain (Herkimer County, New York) =

Part of the Adirondack Mountains in the U.S. state of New York

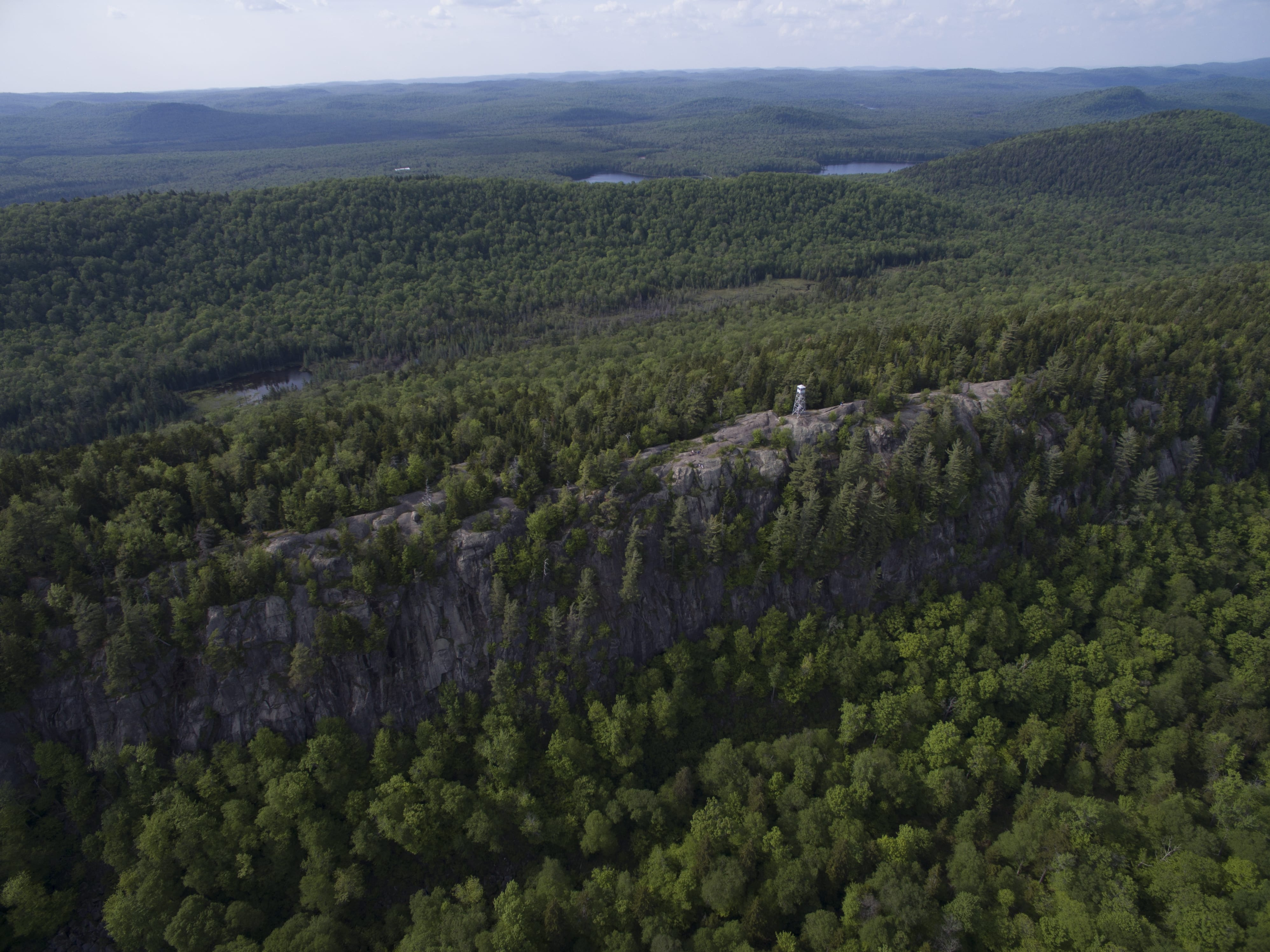
- Aerial view of Bald Mountain looking North

Highest point
- Elevation: 2,313 feet (705 m)
- Coordinates: 43°44′19″N 74°54′50″W

Geography
- Location within New York Location within the United States
- Location: NE of Old Forge, New York, U.S.
- Topo map: USGS Old Forge

Bald Mountain, or Rondaxe Mountain, is a part of the Adirondack Mountains in the U.S. state of New York. The trail leading up the mountain is a popular hike, likely due to its proximity to tourist towns (such as Old Forge, NY). The mountain is also home to the Rondaxe Mountain Fire Tower, which contributes to the trail's popularity.

== History ==
Bald Mountain was used by Verplanck Colvin in the 1870s as a survey point. Colvin suggested in 1886 that the summit take the name "Mt. St. Louis".

== Official name ==
Bald Mountain is the name most commonly used today, but it was officially renamed Rondaxe Mountain in 1912, when a fire tower was erected on a mountain in Croghan with the same name. The name Rondaxe was taken from the nearby Rondaxe Lake.

== Hiking ==
The trail is just under a mile long and climbs 500 feet in elevation. The fire tower is the most popular in the Adirondacks, with over 15,000 visitors annually.
