= Bald Mountain (Humboldt County) =

Mountain in California, United States

- Location within California Location within the United States

Highest point
- Elevation: 3,153 ft (961 m)
- Coordinates: 40°52′55.05″N 123°21′55.38″W

Geography
- Location: Humboldt County, California, United States
- Topo map: USGS Lord-Ellis Summit

Bald Mountain, in Humboldt County, California is located at 40°52′56″N 123°51′56″W 11.4 miles east of Arcata that rises to an elevation of 3,150 ft (960 m).
