= Chris Claremont bibliography =

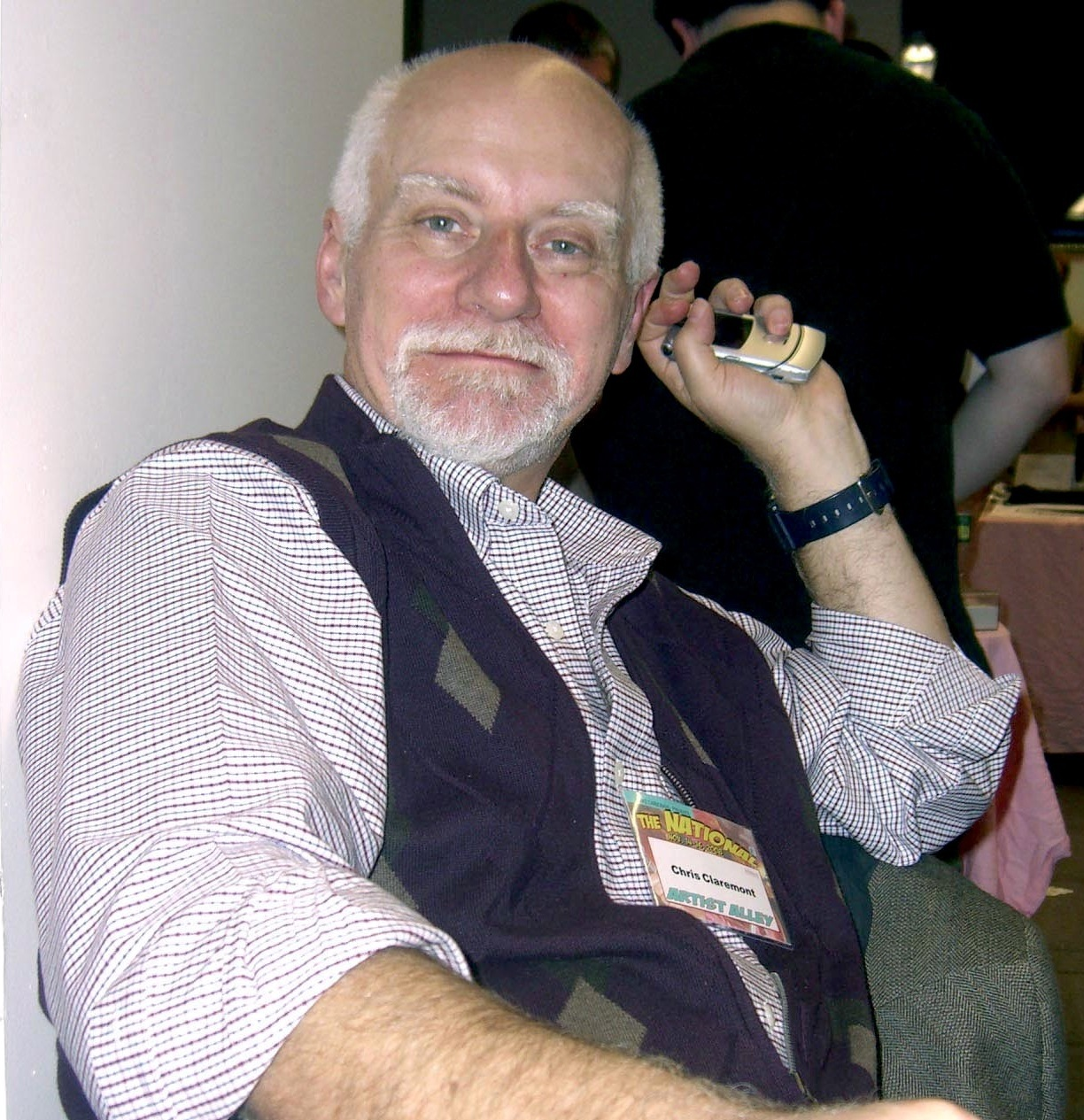
- Claremont at the Big Apple Con, 16 November 2008.
- Active period: 1969–present

Publishers
- Marvel Comics: 1969–present

This is a bibliography of works by writer Chris Claremont.

== Comics ==
=== Dark Horse Comics ===
- Aliens/Predator:The Deadliest of the Species #1-12 (1993-1994)
- Dark Horse Comics #1-2 (1992)

=== DC Comics ===
- Batman Black and White HC Vol. 2 (2002)
- JLA #94–99 (2004)
- JLA: Scary Monsters #1-6 (2003)
- Showcase '95 #12 (Sovereign Seven) (1995)
- Showcase '96 #7 (1996)
- Sovereign Seven #1-36, Annual #1-2 (1995-1998)
- Sovereign Seven plus Legion of Superheroes #1 (1997)
- Star Trek #24 (text essay) (1989)
- Star Trek: Debt of Honor (1992)
- Star Trek: The Next Generation Special #2 (1994)
- Superman/Wonder Woman: Whom Gods Destroy (1996-1997)

==== Wildstorm ====
- Gen¹³ #0-16 (2002-2004)

=== Defiant Comics ===
- Prudence & Caution #1-2 (1994)

=== Image Comics ===
- Cyberforce vol. 2 #9-11 (1994-1995)
- WildC.A.T.s: Covert Action Teams vol. 1 #10-13 (1994)
- Witchblade/Wolverine #1 (2004)

=== Marvel Comics ===
- Alpha Flight vol. 1 #17 (with John Byrne) (1984)
- Amazing Adventures vol. 4 #1 (1988)
- Avengers vol. 1 #102 (plot suggestion to Roy Thomas), Annual #10 (1972, 1981)
- Big Hero 6 #1-5 (2008)
- Bizarre Adventures #25, 27 (1981)
- Black Goliath #2-5 (1976)
- Captain America #237 (with Roger Mckenzie), 258 (1979, 1981)
- Captain Marvel vol. 1 #46 (1976)
- Champions #4 (1976)
- Chris Claremont Anniversary Special #1 (2021)
- Contest of Champions II (1999)
- Daredevil vol. 1 #102, 117, 375, Annual #4 (1973, 1975, 1998)
- Deadly Hands of Kung Fu #19-24, 32–33, Special #1 (1974-1977)
- The Defenders vol. 1 #19, 57 (1975, 1978)
- Dr. Strange vol. 2 #38-45 (1979-1981)
- The Fantastic 4th Voyage of Sinbad (2001)
- Fantastic Four vol. 1 #286 (uncredited, flashback sequence) (1986)
- Fantastic Four vol. 3 #4-32, Annual 1999, 2000 (1998-2000)
- Fantastic Four vs. X-Men #1-4 (1987)
- Gambit: Wanted #1-5 (2026)
- GeNEXT #1-5 (2008)
- GeNEXT: United #1-5 (2009)
- Giant-Size Defenders #5 (1975)
- Giant-Size Dracula #2-3 (1974)
- Giant-Size Fantastic Four #4 (1975)
- Haunt of Horror #2-5 (1974-1975)
- Heroes Reborn: Ashema #1 (2000)
- Heroes Reborn: Doom #1 (2000)
- Heroes Reborn: Doomsday #1 (2000)
- The Incredible Hulk vol. 2 #148, 170, Annual #5 (1972-1973, 1976)
- Iron Fist:
  - Iron Fist vol. 1 #1-15 (1975-1977)
  - Iron Fist 50th Anniversary Special (2024)
  - Power Man #47-49, Annual #1 (1976-1978)
  - Power Man and Iron Fist #50-53, 76 (1978-1981)
  - Marvel Premiere #23-25 (Iron Fist) (1975)
- Iron Man Annual 2001
- John Carter, Warlord of Mars #16-27, Annual #3 (1978-1979)
- King-Size Conan #1 (2020)
- Man-Thing vol. 2 #4-8, 10-11 (1980-1981)
- Marvel Chillers #4 (1976)
- Marvel Classics Comics #14, 17 (1977)
- Marvel Comics #1000 (among others) (2019)
- Marvel Fanfare vol. 1 #1-5, 24, 33, 40 (1982-1988)
- Marvel Premiere #27 (1975)
- Marvel Preview #3, 7, 11, 14-15 (1975-1978)
- Marvel Spotlight vol. 1 #24 (1975)
- Marvel Super-Heroes vol. 3 #10-11 (stories for unpublished Ms. Marvel #24-25, the latter with Simon Furman) (1992)
- Marvel Team-Up vol. 1 #57-70, 74–77, 79–86, 88–89, 100, Annual #1-2 (1976-1980)
- Marvel Two-In-One #9 (with Steve Gerber), #10 (1975)
- Mekanix (2002-2003)
- Monsters Unleashed #4, 9–10, Annual #1 (1974-1975)
- Ms. Marvel #3-23 (1977-1979)
- Peter Parker, the Spectacular Spider-Man #11 (1977)
- Peter Parker: Spider-Man Annual 2000
- Rom #17-18 (story consultant to Bill Mantlo) (1981)
- The Mighty Thor Annual #9 (1981)
- The Savage Sword of Conan #74 (1982)
- Solo Avengers #14 (1989)
- Spider-Woman #34-46 (1981-1982)
- Star Wars #17 (with Archie Goodwin), #53-54, Annual #1 (1978-1981)
- Star-Lord Special Edition #1 (1982)
- Tales of the Zombie #3, 5, 6-9 (1974-1975)
- Vampire Tales #4, 6, 9 (1974-1975)
- Wolverine:
  - Kitty Pryde and Wolverine #1-6 (1984-1985)
  - Wolverine and Kitty Pryde #1-5 (2025)
  - Marvel Age Annual #4 (Wolverine) (1988)
  - Marvel Comics Presents #1-10 (Wolverine) (1988-1989)
  - Witchblade/Wolverine #1 (2004)
  - Wolverine (vol. 1) #1-4 (1982)
  - Wolverine (vol. 2) #1-8, 10, 125-128 (1988-1989, 1998)
  - Wolverine: Black, White & Blood #2 (2020)
  - Wolverine by Chris Claremont #1 (2025) (Note: Previously only available in the Marvel Made Paragon Collection.)
  - Wolverine: Deep Cut #1-4 (2024)
  - Wolverine: Madripoor Knights #1-5 (2024)
- X-Men:
  - Alien Vs X-Men #1-4 (backup stories) (2026)
  - Chaos War: X-Men #1-2 (2011)
  - Classic X-Men #1 (new story), #2-17, 19, 21–24, 29, 41-43 (new backup stories) (1986-1989)
  - Decimation: House of M - The Day After (2006)
  - Excalibur vol. 1 #1-19, 21–25, 27, 32–34, Special Edition (1988-1991)
  - Excalibur vol. 3 #1-14 (2004-2005)
  - Excalibur: Mojo Mayhem (1989)
  - Exiles #90-100 (2007-2008)
  - Gambit vol. 6 Thick as Thieves #1-5 (2022)
  - Giant-Size X-Men #4 (2005)
  - Heroes for Hope starring X-Men #1 (among others) (1985)
  - Magik #1-4 (1983-1984)
  - Marvel Comics Presents vol. 3 #5 (Nightcrawler) (2019)
  - Marvel Graphic Novel #4 (The New Mutants), #5 (X-Men: God Loves Man Kills) (1982)
  - New Excalibur #1-8, 16-24 (#7-8 with Christopher Yost) (2006-2007)
  - New Exiles #1-18, Annual #1 (2008-2009)
  - New Mutants Forever #1-5 (2010-2011)
  - New Mutants Special Edition #1 (1985)
  - New Mutants: War Children #1 (2019)
  - Nightcrawler #1-12 (2014-2015)
  - Phoenix: The Untold Story #1 (1984)
  - The Merry X-Men Holiday Special #1 (2019)
  - The New Mutants vol. 1 #1-54, 63, 81, Annual #1-3 (1983-1989)
  - Uncanny X-Men #59 (plot assist to Roy Thomas), #94–279, 381–389, 444–473, Annual #3-12, 13 (under pseudonym), #14 (1969, 1975–1991, 2000–2001, 2004–2006)
  - Uncanny X-Men Annual #1 (2006)
  - Uncanny X-Men/New Teen Titans (1982)
  - What If... Magneto and Professor X Had Formed the X-Men together? #1 (2005)
  - X-Factor (vol. 1) #65-68 (1991)
  - X-Men (vol. 2) #1-3, 100–109, 165, Annual 2000 (1991, 2000–2001, 2005)
  - X-Men/Alpha Flight #1-2 (1985-1986)
  - X-Men Black: Magneto #1 (2019)
  - X-Men: Black Sun #1-5 (2000)
  - X-Men: Die By The Sword (2007-2008)
  - X-Men: The End (I) - Dreamers and Demons #1-6 (2004-2005)
  - X-Men: The End (II) - Heroes and Martyrs #1-6 (2005)
  - X-Men: The End (III) - Men and X-Men #1-6 (2006)
  - X-Men Forever #1-25, Annual #1, Giant-Size #1 (2009-2010)
  - X-Men Forever Alpha #1 (2009)
  - X-Men Forever 2 # 1-16 (2010-2011)
  - X-Men: Gold #1 (2014)
  - X-Men Legends #12 (Excalibur) (2022)
  - X-Men/Micronauts #1-4 (with Bill Mantlo) (1984)
  - X-Men: Prelude to a Future Past #1 (2025) (Note: Previously only available in the Marvel Made Paragon Collection.)
  - X-Men: Sword of the Braddocks #1 (2009)
  - X-Men: The Exterminated #1 (2019)
  - X-Men: The Wedding Special #1 (2018)
  - X-Men: True Friends #1-3 (1999)
  - X-Men Unlimited (vol. 1) #27, 36, 39, 43 (2000-2003)
  - X-Men Vs. Hulk #1 (2009)
  - X-Treme X-Men #1-46, Annual 2001 (2001-2004)
  - X-Treme X-Men: Savage Land #1-4 (2001-2002)
  - X-Treme X-Men: X-Pose #1-2 (2003)
  - X-Treme X-Men (Vol. 3) #1-5 (2022-2023)
  - X-Women oneshot (2010)
- War Is Hell #9-15 (1974-1975)
- What If? (vol. 2) #32 (1991)

==== Epic Comics ====
- The Black Dragon #1-6 (1985)
- Epic Illustrated #10-12, 18, 22-23 (1982-1984)

==== Marvel UK ====
- Captain Britain vol. 1 #1-10, #27 (with Larry Lieber), Annual #1 (1976-1978)

== Prose ==
- First Flight:
  - First Flight (1987)
  - Grounded! (1991)
  - Sundowner (1994)
- "Luck Be a Lady" (published in the One-Eyed Jacks Wild Cards anthology edited by George R. R. Martin) (1991)
- Chronicles of the Shadow War (with George Lucas))
  - Shadow Moon (1995)
  - Shadow Dawn (1996)
  - Shadow Star (1999)
- X-Men film novelizations
  - X2 (2003)
  - X-Men: The Last Stand (2006)
