= Captain Commando =

Captain Commando may refer to:

- Captain Commando (video game), an arcade game produced by Capcom in 1991, using the Captain Commando character.
- Captain Commando (character), a video game character, and the former mascot of the video game company Capcom
- Captain Commando, a character in Pep Comics

== See also ==
- Commando
