= Battle Circuit =

1997 video game

- Arcade flyer
- Developer: Capcom
- Publisher: Capcom
- Producers: Noritaka Funamizu; Yoshiki Okamoto
- Designers: Ken Kun; Tomoshi Sadamoto
- Composer: Syun Nishigaki
- Platform: Arcade
- Release: JP/EU: March 19, 1997
- Genre: Beat 'em up
- Modes: Single-player, multiplayer
- Arcade system: CP System II

Battle Circuit (Note: Japanese: バトルサーキット, Hepburn: Batoru Sākitto) is a 1997 beat 'em up video game developed and published by Capcom for arcades. Taking place in an alternate future earth, the game revolves around a group of bounty hunters who must capture the mad scientist Dr. Saturn and secure a sophisticated computer disc carrying a program known as the "Shiva System". The game contains comic-like characters in a futuristic science fiction setting, and was Capcom's last beat 'em up game developed for arcades. The game was initially released only in Japan and Europe on March 19, 1997; it made its home console (and North American) debut in Capcom Beat 'Em Up Bundle and was also re-released in Capcom Arcade Stadium.

== Gameplay ==
Four-player gameplay screenshot

Battle Circuit's arcade cabinet provided support for up to four simultaneous players who can each assume the role of five possible characters. Players must progress through a number of levels made up of horizontally scrolling screens filled with enemy characters that must be defeated using a combination of attacks and movement abilities each character utilizes. Every character is given a selection of these abilities that can be expanded as gameplay progress by purchasing special "upgrade discs" after the completion of each level using coins obtained by defeating enemies. These techniques are often a combination of either of the two action buttons and the joystick, and can add additional varieties to a given character's arsenal. A player must attack enemies until their health (indicated by a bar under the player's when the enemy is attacked) is reduced to zero and they are thus knocked out. If a player's health bar is depleted, they will also become knocked out and must use up one life to continue. If all of a player's lives are depleted in this fashion, the game will end unless more credits are purchased.

Pressing both action buttons while on the ground executes a super move that drains life on contact. But when two players perform their super moves at the same time, they will form a team-up attack that provides greater crowd control. There are also special techniques called "Battle Downloads", which can be used by pressing both action buttons while jumping, resulting in the player and his allies (if any are present) gaining a certain attribute, the effect of which is unique to each character. Cyber Blue, for example, can use his Battle Download "Power Up" to increase the amount of damage dealt by attacks, while Yellow Iris' "Speed Up" increases attack speed. A character will start with a stock of two of these techniques to use per life, and can obtain more from capsules scattered throughout the levels, up to a maximum of five.

Various items can be found inside destructible objects such as barrels and crates, and can provide the player with additional health or add points to their total score. Once a player's score reaches a set amount, they are rewarded with an extra life that will give them another chance to continue from where they were knocked out by an enemy.

== Plot ==
Taking place in the future year 20XX, Battle Circuit follows the exploits of a group of super-powered bounty hunters as they apprehend wanted criminals (identified by special serial numbers) in the city of Neo Koba. The game begins with the player attempting to apprehend criminal 9696X, a scientist named Doctor Saturn and his blob-like sidekick aboard his spacecraft orbiting Earth. After the battle, the character selected by the player returns to his employer, Harry, and is promptly given another assignment to capture a member of the "Delete Gang", Johnny, who holds a valuable floppy disk in his possession. The bounty hunter then confronts Johnny at his disco hideout and learns that the disc contains a malicious computer program known as the "Shiva (Tentei) System", which is capable of controlling all computerized systems in the world. After selecting one of the available characters, players must travel through various levels- fighting through a variety of enemies from the Delete Gang- to obtain the disc and claim their bounty.

== Characters ==
Battle Circuit contains five possible characters for the player to choose from, each with their own attacks and Battle Download ability. Though each of the character's real names are mentioned in their individual character profiles during the opening demo, they are mostly referred to by their codenames, each indicating a physical attribute and corresponding color.

- Brian Bruno (Cyber Blue): A seasoned bounty hunter with several cybernetic attachments to his body, giving him the ability to discharge electricity and project energy from his fists. Cyber Blue makes a cameo appearance in Project X Zone 2 in Captain Commando's Solo Unit attack.
- Andrey Mishucin (Captain Silver): A highly accomplished bounty hunter who can stretch and shape his body at will. His powers give him the ability to project ice particles from his body, as well as create a number of objects from his suit. Because of the vast nature of his powers, they will threaten to overwhelm him if he should ever lose concentration.
- Diana Martines (Yellow Iris, called Yellow Beast in the original Japanese version): A part-time fashion model whose feral appearance gives her access to a number of clawing and agility-based techniques. She is also skilled with a whip and is accompanied by her pet fox "Fin". Yellow Iris makes a cameo appearance in Ultimate Marvel vs. Capcom 3 as a DLC costume for Felicia.
- Pinky (Pink Ostrich): A large, sentient, pink ostrich with an eye patch and jewel necklace who is always accompanied by her owner, a young girl named Pola Abdul (a pun on Paula Abdul). Purportedly, she is the "only ostrich in the world who can fly", and attacks with an assortment of aerial and spinning techniques.
- Unknown (Alien Green): An alien creature of unknown origin who resembles a large venus flytrap with leglike roots, a small lizardlike growth on its neck and a large eye in its abdomen. Its attacks mostly center around its vinelike arms, which it can quickly swing to create whirlwinds, as well as grab opponents and slam them against the ground.

== Development ==
Battle Circuit was initially developed as a racing game for up to 8 players, with artwork by Haruki Suetsugu. Despite being completed, this version of the game was never released.

In 1997, work began on a new version of Battle Circuit. This version was developed by producers Noritaka Funamizu and Yoshiki Okamoto of Capcom's arcade production team. While structurally very similar to the company's early scrolling action games like Final Fight and Alien vs. Predator, Battle Circuit is set apart stylistically by employing a manga-style science fiction approach to story and character artwork. Ikeno Metaka, overseen by Ohnishi Hiroki and Yamamoto Kouji, created an assortment of characters with features reminiscent of older Capcom characters and superfluous comic book elements.

The game saw a speedy translation effort that effectively made the title available in both Japan and parts of Europe on the same day. Though there are no game play differences between the Japanese and English-language versions of the game, a few pieces of Japanese dialogue were omitted from the European release. The game was not released in North American arcades or any other part of the world. Moreover, even at the time of its release in arcades, Capcom stated it had no plans to release the game for home consoles. On September 18, 2018, it was released on Capcom Beat 'Em Up Bundle digitally for the PlayStation 4, Nintendo Switch, Xbox One and Microsoft Windows.

Battle Circuit's background music was composed by Syun Nishigaki of Capcom Arcade Sound Team, and has a recurring pop and electronic theme present throughout the game. The music was recorded using only synth-based computer generated sound, a common recording medium for arcade games on the CPS-2. An official soundtrack entitled Battle Circuit Original Soundtrack (catalog number VICL-60056) was released commercially in Japan by Victor Entertainment on July 2, 1997 and retailed for ¥2,205.

The character Pinky borrows many moves from the character Zelkin of Capcom's fighter Star Gladiator.

== Reception ==
In Japan, Game Machine listed Battle Circuit on their June 1, 1997 issue as being the eighth most-successful arcade game of the month, outperforming titles such as Street Fighter EX Plus and Magical Drop III.

== See also ==
- List of beat 'em ups
