= Elora Danan =

- Willow character
- Elora Danan as an infant
- First appearance: Willow (1988)
- Created by: George Lucas
- Portrayed by: Kate Greenfield (film); Ruth Greenfield (film); Rebecca Bearman (film); Kristen Lang (film); Isla Brentwood (film); Laura Hopkirk (film); Gina Nelson (film); Ellie Bamber (TV series)

In-universe information
- Aliases: Dove; Brünhilde
- Occupation: Princess of Tir Asleen; Scullery maid (as Dove)
- Family: Willow Ufgood (guardian); Sorsha (guardian); Madmartigan (guardian); Unnamed mother

Elora Danan is a fictional character from the 1988 fantasy film Willow, and in the 2022 sequel TV series, Willow. She is a Daikini, one of the large-sized races of people in the film (as opposed to the dwarf-sized Nelwyns and mouse-sized Brownies). She is played by several different infants in the film, and by Ellie Bamber in the TV series.

== Casting ==
Danan in the film was initially played by infant twins Kate and Ruth Greenfield. Although credited for the role, they grew too large for the props that held them on Warwick Davis’ back, so Rebecca Bearman, niece of second assistant director Gerry Toomey, was used throughout most of the film. Kristen Lang played her for scenes shot in Marin County. Babies Isla Brentwood, Laura Hopkirk, and Gina Nelson played her for the parts filmed in New Zealand. In the more dangerous scenes, however, a thirteen-pound animatronic baby with a remote-controlled moveable head and mouth, called "Motobaby", was used instead.

Bamber entered into negotiations to play the adult Danan in November 2020.

== Characterization ==
In the film, Danan is identified as being of the fictional Daikini species, likely derived from the Sanskrit word, ḍākinī, a type of female spirit, goddess, or demon in Hinduism and Buddhism. The character is "the powerful child who is prophesized to appear and unite the people".

With respect to the adult character, Bamber stated in an interview that the Willow TV series presents the story of Elora Danan as "a real coming of age story about a woman coming into her power and understanding who she is and what she was kind of born to do". The character is first shown as a kitchen maid, but is also "brave, determined, tenacious", and when the prince with whom she is in love is kidnapped, "she wants to kind of go along and help find him because she believes that she's the person that could really help to find him, but nobody else wants her there". Bamber also noted that she and star Warwick Davis were able to improvise much of their dialogue in the series. She has been raised under the pseudonym, Brunhilde, nicknamed Dove, and is a kitchen maid, in love with royal heir Airk. When Airk is kidnapped, she joins the quest to save him.

With respect to the fourth episode, "The Whispers of Nockmaar", where the character has a vision of the death of her mother, showrunner Jonathan Kasdan points to this as a moment that would galvanize Elora's participation in the quest, saying that "we thought it was critical and really sort of revelatory for Elora to have a moment where she hears from her own mother this faith and belief in her."

== Character plot ==
=== Film ===
Fearful of a prophecy that a girl would be born who would bring about her downfall, the evil Queen Bavmorda of Nockmaar imprisoned all pregnant women in her realm. Elora was born in prison and identified as the prophesied one by a birthmark on her arm. Bavmorda wanted to kill her at birth, but her mother convinced a midwife to smuggle her out. Both mother and midwife died to keep the child safe.

After her midwife's death, Elora was found by a young Nelwyn farmer named Willow Ufgood, who initially wanted nothing to do with her but later embraced his role as her protector and attempts to take her to Tir Asleen. Bavmorda's efforts to destroy Elora, preventing the prophecy, led to the former's downfall. Afterwards, Willow leaves Elora in the caring arms of Bavmorda's daughter Sorsha, the new queen, and Madmartigan.

=== Television ===
Sometime after Bavmorda's defeat, Willow has a falling out with Queen Sorsha after she refuses to allow him to train Elora Danan in the magical arts. Sorsha wants Elora to lead a normal life while Willow regards her as a weapon against the Withered Crone, the leader of the Gales. Elora's true identity is concealed even from herself, and she is raised not knowing that she is the prophesied savior of the land.

By the time she is an adult, Elora's identity is revealed—even to herself—by Willow, now a powerful and wise sorcerer, who recognizes her among the group banded together to rescue the kidnapped prince of the kingdom. During the journey, Willow teaches Elora the magical arts but she has trouble activating her powers. Elora is later kidnapped by soldiers sent to rescue her but corrupted by evil forces, but not before using magic to create a sapling.

The corrupted soldiers intend to deliver Elora to the evil Crone, who plans to banish her from the mortal realm, just like Bavmorda. Elora escapes and meets two woodcutters who are killed by the soldiers, who recapture Elora. Willow and the others intercept them and a second skirmish ensues, with Elora's friends prevailing, though one of them, Graydon, becomes corrupted.

Willow prepares to exorcise the corruption from Graydon at Queen Bavmorda's castle with Elora's help, and Elora experiences visions of her birth and her mother's subsequent execution. The possessed Graydon breaks free and tricks Elora into entering the high tower where he plans to corrupt her, but Willow and the others successfully exorcise Graydon. The Gales arrive and pursue Elora and her friends through the ruins of Bavmorda's castle. They flee into the Wildwood, where they are captured by the Bone Reavers, outlaws who seek freedom from Tir Asleen and other powers. Elora reveals that she stole Chalindria's wand and is able to use it to briefly escape. The Bone Reavers ultimately welcome the travelers and throw a feast, where truth plums cause Elora to learn that Willow defeated Bavmorda with dumb luck.

Trolls capture Kit and Willow and bring them to their underground city as prisoners, and Elora and the others mount a rescue mission and infiltrate the mines disguised as trolls. They reach the base of the troll city only to discover that Elora's spell has liquified the ground. Kit is furious with Elora, thinking that she has prevented her from reuniting with Madmartigan. Kit is sucked into the liquified abyss while Elora tries to use her magic to free her. In the Immemorial City, Airk experiences a vision of Kit drowning and being rescued by Elora.

Meanwhile, Elora and her companions continue their journey across the Shattered Sea. During the journey, Elora continues her training with Willow but struggles to reach her full potential. Kit and Elora also resolve their differences. Reaching the edge of the Shattered Sea, Elora and Kit jump over the edge and find themselves in the Immemorial City where they encounter a changed Airk. Airk claims that Lili, whom Elora and Kit recognize as the Crone, has shown him the truth and will help usher a new age ruled by her master, the Wyrm. In her fair form, the Crone invites Elora and Kit to enter an inner chamber, where she attempts to convince them to submit to the Wyrm. Meanwhile the others have jumped over the edge of the Shattered Sea and confront the Crone in the Immemorial City, freeing Elora and Kit from their trance. Elora and her friends fight the Crone, her minions, and the enchanted Airk. Graydon is seemingly killed in the battle but Elora manages to use her powers to kill the Crone and free Airk. Elora and her friends depart home, seeking to honor Graydon's memory. Unbeknownst to them, Graydon is still alive as the Wyrm uses Elora's form to sway him into leading his army.

== Other media ==
Teenage Elora Danan on the cover of the third book in the Chronicles of the Shadow War trilogy, Shadow Star.

Elora Danan also appears as the central character in a series of novels called the Chronicles of the Shadow War trilogy, set about fifteen years after the events of the original film. These novels bear no relation to the later TV series and are in their own continuity.

== Reception and cultural impact ==
In the film, the infant Elora Danan has been described as "more of an adorable McGuffin" than a main character. She has been noted in this appearance as being one of a long tradition of characters in fiction and myth prophesized to bring about the destruction of the villain of the story, and whom the villain therefore actively seeks to kill, setting forth the chain of events that in fact leads to the death of the villain.

The lead character in the 2021 TV series, Reservation Dogs, is named Elora Danan Postoak, after the Willow character. The significance of the name surfaces in that show when the character meets people who are familiar with the film, Willow.

== See also ==
- Willow (NES video game)
