= Shadow Star (novel) =

2000 novel by Chris Claremont and George Lucas

- Author: Chris Claremont, George Lucas
- Cover artist: Ciruelo Cabral
- Language: English
- Series: Chronicles of the Shadow War
- Genre: Fantasy literature
- Published: 1999 (Bantam Spectra)
- Publication place: United States
- Media type: Print (Hardback & Paperback)
- Pages: 544
- ISBN: 0-553-57288-1
- OCLC: 45257556
- Preceded by: Shadow Dawn

Shadow Star is the third novel in the Chronicles of the Shadow War trilogy, published in 1999. It was written by Chris Claremont in collaboration with George Lucas. Preceded by Shadow Moon (1995) and Shadow Dawn (1996), it was the third book in the continuation of events from the 1988 motion picture Willow.

== Plot ==
Elora Danan has slain the dragons – who embody the soul of creation – to prevent their power being harnessed by The Deceiver, a maleficent version of herself from an alternative future (Note: As revealed in Shadow Dawn.) . Thorn Drumheller wraps the last two dragon eggs in a spell that will prevent himself and Khory Bannefin from giving them up, even at the cost of their lives. While attempting to heal a wound inflicted by The Deceiver on Khory, Elora is transported to a vision of the latter's past. There, she reunites with Calan Dineer, learning that Khory was once a powerful weapon against The Malevoiy. During one battle, she came close to defeating them, only to be betrayed by her Commander. The world remembered this betrayal, eventually leading to The Malevoiy's banishment to the dragon realm.

As the trio leave the realm, they are pursued by The Malevoiy, who try to tempt Elora into joining them. This would enable them to once again rule the Twelve Realms, just as they did before the betrayal from Khory's Commander. Black Rose assassins arrive and mortally wound Elora with an arrow to the lung. Khory wards them off, bringing herself, Thorn and Elora to a worldgate that leads them back to the Sandeni fort of Tregare.

To heal herself from the attack, Elora forces herself into a coma where she once again faces temptation from The Malevoiy. She awakes to find herself being cared for in Tregare by Thorn, Rool and Franjean. The fort is soon attacked by the Chengwei, spurring Elora to help mount defences. The Chengwei go on to attack in four waves. Between the second and third, Elora sings a song to her troops that inspires and motivates them to fight against the coming slaughter. As the battles continue to rage, Elora hides at a scribe's library with Luc-Jon. There, she attempts to learn more about her purpose and how to rise against The Deceiver and The Caliban. The Chengwei take control of Tregare using a magic-disrupting device called "The Resonator". The Caliban also arrives and unsuccessfully attempts to seize Elora before escaping.

In the aftermath, Elora travels to the Chengwei city with Rool, Franjean and Luc-Jon in hope of finding Thorn, who is building another resonator, more powerful than the device that befell Tregare. The Deceiver arrives and the resonator is activated. Chengwei sorcerers attempt to control the device while trying to ward her off. The Caliban also enters the fray. One spell goes awry, and Elora is inadvertently killed by some dark magic The Deceiver intended for the sorcerers. Stuck between the realms of life and death, the Malevoiy once more tempt Elora to join them. This time, she accepts, seizing the chance for life by fusing herself with them, and becoming a Malevoiy. She fights The Deceiver as Thorn, Rool, Franjean and the Chengwei escape the collapsing palace. The Chengwei city is destroyed. Thorn decides to build a second resonator, sending word to other Nelwyns and Elves to rally an army of constructors.

The Deceiver pursues Elora to Angwyn, the city she grew up in. Elora notices the delegation who were frozen as they were about to witness her ascension to Queen of the twelve realms. (Note: As depicted in Shadow Moon.) This makes her pause despite being consumed by the Malevoiy, who she notes were not invited to the ceremony. Meanwhile, Thorn, Rool, Franjean, Khory and the constructors travel to Nockmaar. Thorn and the Nelywns activate their own resonator, which opens a portal between Nockmaar and Angwyn, the world's two strongest points of magic. Khory kills Elora, whose body is brought - along with The Deceiver - into Nockmaar. The resonator also allows the Malevoiy to re-enter the realm of flesh. As they attack, Elora is resurrected as herself, shedding her Malevoiy aspects. The Caliban arrives before being stripped of his magical disguise by the device. It is revealed that he is the Commander who betrayed Khory to the Malevoiy in her former life. Khory and him fight before the former gains the upper hand.

Elora learns that when Bavmorda attempted to banish her to the thirteenth night when she was an infant, (Note: As depicted in the 1988 film Willow.) the spell created two versions of the future and two Eloras - her and The Deceiver. Elora joins with the latter, who has given in to despair, and learns what drove her to evil. In The Deceiver's timeline, she had a happy upbringing, ascended to Queen, and tried to rule the realms. However, she saw deceit at every turn, leading her to exterminate the realms, including the Malevoiy and dragons. The resonator also reveals to Elora that Calan Dineer is her father. Elora shows her dark twin the way to hope, and they release the dragon egg, giving birth to a new generation of dreams. Elora realizes that she was never meant to rule the Twelve realms, but give them hope, persuade them to work together. The dragon fire reduces Nockmaar to molten rock, eliminating the Malevoiy threat and leaving flowers that resemble the triumphant heroes.

Six months later, the Shadow War is over. Elora leads a happy life trouping as singer and dancer, providing hope to those who need it. She reminisces on her experiences of all twelve realms with Thorn, Anakerie, Khory, Rool, Franjean, Anele and Bastian, whose stories "have only just begun".

== Reception ==
A review in Library Journal said that the book "serves up a wealth of sword and sorcery as well as a host of memorable, larger-than-life characters".
