= Captain Commando (video game) =

1991 video game

- North American cover art
- Developer: Capcom
- Publisher: Capcom
- Producer: Yoshiki Okamoto
- Designers: Akira Yasuda; Junichi Ohno
- Artist: Akira Yasuda
- Composer: Masaki Izutani
- Platforms: Arcade, Super NES, PlayStation
- Release: Arcade: NA: September 1991; JP: November 1991; Super NES: JP: March 17, 1995; NA: August 1995; EU: 1995; PlayStation: JP: September 17, 1998
- Genre: Beat 'em up
- Modes: Single-player, multiplayer
- Arcade system: CP System

Captain Commando (Note: Japanese: キャプテンコマンドー, Hepburn: Kyaputen Komandō) is a 1991 beat 'em up game developed and published by Capcom for arcades. It was the seventeenth game produced for the company's CP System hardware. The game stars the titular superhero, who was originally conceived as a fictional spokesman used by Capcom USA in the company's console games during the late 1980s. The game was included in Capcom Beat 'Em Up Bundle compilation title, which was released digitally for Nintendo Switch, PlayStation 4, Xbox One, and Windows in September 2018.

== Plot ==
The game is set in a futuristic version of Metro City, the setting of Capcom's other beat 'em up, Final Fight, and features several loose ties with the characters and settings from that game. The year is 2026, and the world is filled with crime. Captain Commando and his three faithful Commando Companions rise up to erase this crime from Planet Earth and from all the Galaxy, but the futuristic criminals they have to fight are endowed with secret hidden evil superpowers. Many of them are known as Super Criminals, with abilities beyond that of ordinary mere mortals. The leader of all the Super Criminals himself is a maniacal tyrannical alien known as Scumocide (known as Genocide in Japan).

== Characters ==
=== Commando Team ===
Captain Commando (キャプテンコマンドー, Kyaputen Komandō)

He is both the team leader and the team founder. Besides his powerful mind and strong body, he also uses his "Energy Gloves", which can shoot mighty bolts of fire and electricity. His killer technique is the "Captain Corridor". Striking the ground with his Energy Gloves causes an electric shock which kills everyone around him. Captain Commando's dash attacks are "Captain Cannon" (also known as "Captain Fire") which torches the enemy with a blast of flame and "Captain Kick" which can hit several enemies at once on the ground or in the air. Captain Commando also can grab his opponent and kick their stomach or throw their whole body. Other things he uses are the "Captain Goggles" which help him identify a criminal's face at a distance of 2 km, by comparing with data base, the "Captain Protector" which is made of super-tough material called "Captanium" and stands up to trillion degree heat, the "Captain Gauntlet" which multiplies Captain's power 48 times making it easy for him to smash a thick iron plate and the "Captain Boots" which make it possible for him to take a 100-meter fall without injuries or damage to the boots.

Mack the Knife (ジェネティー, Jenetī; Jennety in the Japanese version)

The Mummy Commando is a mummy-like alien from outer space. He uses sub-sonic knives that melt any enemy he hits. His killer technique is the "Spinning Attack". Spinning around like a top, his bandages lash his enemies like whips. Mack's dash attacks are "Double Trouble" which sticks his enemy with both knives and "Sky Assault" which is an airborne version of Double Trouble. Mack also can grab his enemy and either stick or throw them. Other things he has are the "Captain Cap" which is a souvenir from the first meeting with Captain Commando, the "Genetic Bandage" which is his life-sustaining equipment for survival on Earth, the "Genetic Knife" which melts all matter and the "Gravity Controllers" which are his pair of shoes that adjust the gravitational pull to where it is best for the battles. Mack's English name comes from the Bertolt Brecht song of the same title.

Ginzu the Ninja (翔, Shō; Sho in the Japanese version)

The Ninja Commando is a highly trained ninja and a 41st successor to Bushin-ryu Ninpo, a fighting style of ninjutsu from Final Fight, and his father and direct predecessor, Gou directly succeeded the style's past practitioner, Guy. His razor-sharp sword is capable of cutting an opponent in two. His killer technique is his "Smoke Bomb". After creating a smoke screen around his body, the smoke explodes, killing his enemies that are adjacent. Ginzu's dash attacks are "Iaizuki" which pierces several enemies at once and "Flying Katana" which cuts the enemies from above while jumping. Ginzu can grab his opponents and either kick their stomach or do a shoulder throw or overhead throw. Other things he is equipped with are his "Ninja Eyes" which can help him find enemies 500 meters ahead in pitch dark, his "Servant Sword" serves no one but him, is named "Lightning Light" and cuts things at atomic levels and his "Ninja Suit" which is tougher than iron and softer than silk. He is the only character who is able to throw shurikens at his opponents.

Baby Head (フーバー, Fūbā; Hoover in the Japanese version)

The Baby Commando is a super genius infant who fights using a robot of his own design. His robot is both strong and quick. His killer technique is his "Knee Rocket" which launches a missile from the robot's knee which are constantly manufactured within the robot. Baby Head's dash attacks are "Rolling Punch" which is a strong punch that spins like a drill and "Elbow Smash" which crushes the enemy under an elbow blow coming off a jump. Baby Head can grab his enemies and do either a knee kick, a "Pile-driver" or a "Fling-away". Other features he uses are the "Talking Machine" which resembles a baby pacifier and allows him to speak the 3 million languages of the cosmos, the "Stable Cradle" which keeps the robot from rocking, no matter how far it is tilted, the "Silverfist Vehicle" which has 12,000 horsepower, 582 kilograms (1280.4 pounds) of bodyweight and mounts fuzzy-logic control, the "Missile Launcher" which is a missile production facility built inside the leg, as well as in the Silvervest Vehicle and is nicknamed by Baby Head's friends "Baby Carriage" and the "Jet Hover" which is used for high-speed position shifting.

== Gameplay ==
Arcade version screenshot

Captain Commando follows the same gameplay established in Capcom's previous beat-'em-up Final Fight. The arcade version allows up to two, three, or even four players simultaneously depending on the game's settings. The player can select between any of the four "commandos" (Mack, Captain, Ginzu, or Baby-Head) as their character, with each player controlling a different character. The player's objective as usual is to move towards the end of each stage, defeat every adversary who gets in their way while avoiding any traps that they may throw at the player's way before eventually fighting the boss awaiting at the final area of each stage. The game consists of a total of nine stages.

The control configuration is exactly like Final Fight, with an eight-way joystick for moving the character left or right, as well as towards or away from the background, along with two action buttons for attacking and jumping. The player can perform numerous combinations of attacks while standing or jumping, including grabbing the enemy, as well as a special attack by pressing the attack and jump simultaneously that will drain a portion of the player's vitality. An addition to the controls is the ability to dash by pushing the joystick left or right twice. The player can perform a running attack or even a running jump attack.

Like in Final Fight, the player can pick up health-restoring food items hidden inside barrels and other destructible objects to restore their vitality, as well as other bonus items to increase their score. Weapons also can be picked up, such as three different types of firearms, as well as shurikens that can only be used by Ginzu. Players also can ride certain robots by dismounting their riders and then jumping over the robot. The robots have their own vitality gauge and if they sustain enough damage, they will be destroyed. There are three types of robots in the game: a punching robot, a flame-throwing robot, and a freezing robot. Unlike Final Fight, weapons can be carried when the player makes the transition to a new area until the stage is completed.

== Development ==
Earlier depictions of Captain Commando from the rear packaging of Capcom's NES games. The rendition on the left was featured in games released between 1986 and 1987, while the rendition on the right is from games released in 1989.

The origin of Captain Commando as a character predates his appearance in his self-titled game, in the packaging and manuals of many of Capcom's earlier titles for the Nintendo Entertainment System and Commodore 64 in North America released between 1986 and 1989. All of Capcom's games released for the NES between 1986 and 1988 (1942, Commando, Ghosts 'n Goblins, Mega Man, Trojan, Section Z and Gun Smoke) were released as part of the "Captain Commando Challenge Series" and featured a drawing of the Captain on the back of the packaging, which depicted him as a "futuristic" space hero wielding a raygun on each hand and two large medallions around his neck with the letter "C" engraved on each. Each game's instruction manual also featured a "Special Message" from the Captain addressed to the owner of the game, congratulating the player for purchasing one of Capcom's products. Additionally, the instruction manual for Section Z has the otherwise nameless player character uniting with Captain Commando himself, although it is unclear if that means they both control the spacesuit or if Captain Commando is a separate character.

A revised version of the Captain Commando character appeared again in Capcom's NES lineup in 1989 (Strider, Mega Man 2, Willow, and Duck Tales). The artwork on the rear packaging of those games featured an illustration of Captain Commando wearing a pilot suit in front of a fighter jet, holding a helmet under his right arm, with an alien chimp sitting on his right shoulder and the Capcom logo in an airbrushed style above them. The text above the artwork featured a message from the Captain advising the reader to "look to (him) for up-to-date reports for all the exciting action games from Capcom", followed by the Captain's apparent handwritten signature.

The character was redesigned for the arcade game by Akira Yasuda (AKA Akiman), who thought the original Capcom USA version looked "uncool".

== Home versions and related releases ==
- A Super NES 16 Meg port was released in 1995. This port only allows up to two players, shows less on-screen enemies and lacks the mech-suit. It is also censored on several aspects.
- A PlayStation port was released in Japan only on September 17, 1998, by New Inc. This port allows up to three players with the use of a multiplayer adapter (4 players with Cheat / GameShark).
- The original CPS game is included in emulated form in the compilations Capcom Classics Collection: Remixed for the PlayStation Portable, Capcom Classics Collection Volume 2 for the PlayStation 2 and Xbox, both released in 2006, Capcom Beat 'Em Up Bundle for the PlayStation 4, Nintendo Switch, Xbox One and Microsoft Windows in 2018, and Capcom Arcade Stadium for the PlayStation 4, Nintendo Switch, Xbox One and Microsoft Windows in 2021.
- A Sega CD port for the game was planned, but was cancelled.

== Legacy ==
Captain Commando would return as a player character in the fighting game Marvel vs. Capcom in 1998, as one of the characters representing Capcom. The Captain has a transformation sequence prior to each match which depicts him in a suit (or in a cowboy outfit) before donning his superhero costume. His "Commando Strike" special move, as well as both of his Hyper Combos (the "Captain Sword" and the "Captain Storm"), has him summoning his "Commando Companions" to attack his opponent. The Captain's victory quotes consist of random Capcom trivia, while his ending in Marvel vs. Capcom is a homage to the ending in his original game. This incarnation of Captain Commando also appears in the sequel, Marvel vs. Capcom 2. Besides the Marvel vs. Capcom games, Captain Commando also appears in four other cross-over games: Capcom World 2, Namco × Capcom, Project X Zone 2 and the SNK vs. Capcom: Card Fighters series. A two-volume manga was also published in Japan in 1994 in Gamest Comics, which was translated and published overseas by UDON. Ninja Commando's father, Gou appears in Street Fighter 6, and is revealed to be Guy's direct successor and serves as one of Kimberly Jackson's teachers, confirming Captain Commando is part of Street Fighter shared universe, but takes place in the future.

== Reception ==
Reception

Review scores
Publication	Score
AllGame	(SNES) 2.5/5
Consoles +	(SNES) 80% (PS) 86%
Hyper	(SNES) 72/100
M! Games	(SNES) 53%
Mega Fun	(SNES) 59%
Player One	(SNES) 69%
Total!	(SNES) 5+
Video Games (DE)	(SNES) 57%
Zero	(ARC) 2.5/5
Fun Generation	(PS) 2/10
Game Zone	(ARC) 2.5/5
Top Consoles	(SNES) 13/20
Última Generación	(SNES) 62/100

Award
Publication	Award
Gamest (1992)	(ARC) Grand Prize 7th, Best Action Award 3rd, Best VGM Award 10th, Player Popularity 3rd, Annual Hit Game 3rd, Editorial Department Special Award

In Japan, Game Machine listed Captain Commando on their December 1, 1991 issue as being the most-popular arcade game for the previous two weeks. The Japanese publication Micom BASIC Magazine ranked the game nineteenth in popularity in its February 1992 issue. According to game designer Akira Yasuda, the game sold about 15,000 arcade units worldwide.

Sinclair User gave Captain Commando the shared award for "Games Most Likely To Save The Universe" as one of the best superhero games, along with Captain America and The Avengers and Spider-Man: The Video Game. Gamest also gave the game several awards at the sixth annual "Gamest Awards", placing 7th in the "Grand Prize", placing 3rd in the "Best Action Award", 10th in the "Best VGM Award", 3rd in the "Player Popularity", and 3rd in the "Annual Hit Game", as well as a "Editorial Department Special Award". In 2013, Heavy ranked it as one of the top twenty five beat 'em up video games of all time.

=== Super NES ===
Captain Commando received a 18.9/30 score in a readers' poll conducted by Super Famicom Magazine. The Super NES version garnered mixed reception from critics. In 2018, Complex included the game on their best Super Nintendo games of all-time list.
