= Capcom Beat 'Em Up Bundle =

2018 video game

- Developer: Capcom
- Publisher: Capcom
- Engine: MT Framework
- Platforms: Nintendo Switch, PlayStation 4, Xbox One, Windows
- Release: Nintendo Switch, PlayStation 4, Xbox One: WW: 18 September 2018; JP: 20 September 2018; Windows: WW: 10 October 2018
- Genre: Beat 'em up
- Modes: Single-player, multiplayer

Capcom Beat 'Em Up Bundle (released in Japan and Asia as Capcom Belt Action Collection (Note: Capcom Belt Action Collection (Japanese: カプコン ベルトアクション コレクション, Hepburn: Kapukon Beruto Akushon Korekushon))) is a 2018 beat 'em up game compilation developed and published by Capcom. Featuring emulated versions of various beat 'em up video games from Capcom's history, it was released for Nintendo Switch, PlayStation 4, and Xbox One in September 2018, with the game being released for Windows later in October. A physical release occurred in Japan on 6 December for PlayStation 4 and Nintendo Switch.

== Gameplay ==
Capcom Beat 'Em Up Bundle is a compilation that collects the arcade versions of seven beat 'em ups from Capcom:

- Final Fight (1989)
- Captain Commando (1991)
- The King of Dragons (1991)
- Knights of the Round (1992)
- Warriors of Fate (1992)
- Armored Warriors (1994)
- Battle Circuit (1997)

Each of the seven games includes the option to play the English or Japanese version of the game. In addition, all of the games support online multiplayer. This release marks the first home console releases for both Armored Warriors and Battle Circuit.

The collection includes a gallery to view concept art, final art, characters and art from the collection itself.
