= Shadow Dawn =

1996 novel by Chris Claremont and George Lucas

- First edition
- Author: Chris Claremont, George Lucas
- Cover artist: Ciruelo Cabral
- Language: English
- Series: Chronicles of the Shadow War
- Genre: Fantasy literature
- Published: 1996 (Bantam Spectra)
- Publication place: United States
- Media type: Print (Hardback & Paperback)
- Pages: 528
- ISBN: 0-553-57289-X
- OCLC: 38861012
- Preceded by: Shadow Moon
- Followed by: Shadow Star

Shadow Dawn is a fantasy novel written by Chris Claremont with George Lucas. Published in 1996, it is the second book in the Chronicles of the Shadow War trilogy and the sequel to Shadow Moon, continuing events from the 1988 motion picture Willow. The protagonist, Elora, is 16 years old at the beginning of Shadow Dawn. It is followed by Shadow Star.

== Plot ==
Three years after he consumed the soul of Castellan Mohdri, The Deceiver is conquering the realms with his army of Maizan riders, who are under orders to capture Thorn Drumheller and Elora Danan. The latter is in hiding with a clan of Rock Nelywns underground. Torquil Ufgood, Thorn's cousin, monitors her magical abilities, soon recognising that Fire Realm magic has no effect on her. His Nelywn clan soon learns that the Maizan has conquered Testaverde, and deduces their next target to be Sandeni, a state impervious to the effects of magic.

That night, a firedrake transports Elora to a mountain elsewhere. There, she finds a pool of its kind being held by another Nelywyn clan to build a world gate that can provide access to other realms. While attempting to free the firedrakes, Elora has a bizarre vision - an idealized version of herself, followed by a dark figure's formation and approach. She flees the mountain, only to be found by Rool and Bastian. Wishing to reunite with Thorn, who she feels is the closest she has to family, Elora persuades Rool to ride with her on Bastian to Sandeni, where he is currently hiding. En route, the trio discovers a village sieged by Elves and Goblins.
