= First Flight (novel) =

Cover of the first edition, with art by Luis Royo.

First Flight is a science fiction novel by American writer Chris Claremont, published by Ace Books in 1987.

== Plot summary ==
First Flight is a novel about US Air Force officer Lt. Nicole Shea, which takes place in the frontier of space in the near future.

== Reception ==
Lynn Bryant reviewed First Flight in Space Gamer/Fantasy Gamer No. 83. Bryant commented that "First Flight is a well paced, fast moving adventure that is tempered with some good characterizations and a bit of mystery."

== Reviews ==
- Review by Don D'Ammassa (1988) in Science Fiction Chronicle, #101 February 1988
- Review by Mark J. McGarry (1988) in Thrust, #30, Summer 1988
- Review by Andy Sawyer (1990) in Paperback Inferno, #84
- Review by Paul J. McAuley (1990) in Interzone, #39 September 1990
