= Willow (1988 film) =

Film by Ron Howard

- Theatrical release poster by John Alvin
- Directed by: Ron Howard
- Screenplay by: Bob Dolman
- Story by: George Lucas
- Produced by: Nigel Wooll
- Starring: Val Kilmer; Joanne Whalley; Warwick Davis; Billy Barty; Jean Marsh
- Cinematography: Adrian Biddle
- Edited by: Daniel P. Hanley; Mike Hill; Richard Hiscott
- Music by: James Horner
- Production companies: Metro-Goldwyn-Mayer; Lucasfilm Ltd.; Imagine Entertainment
- Distributed by: MGM/UA Distribution Co.
- Release date: May 20, 1988 (United States)
- Running time: 126 minutes
- Country: United States
- Language: English
- Budget: $35 million
- Box office: $137.6 million

Willow is a 1988 American fantasy adventure film directed by Ron Howard and produced by Nigel Wooll. The film was executive produced by George Lucas and written by Bob Dolman from a story by Lucas. The film stars Warwick Davis, Val Kilmer, Joanne Whalley, Billy Barty and Jean Marsh. Davis portrays aspiring magician Willow Ufgood, who teams up with disaffected warrior Madmartigan (Kilmer) to protect young baby princess Elora Danan from evil queen Bavmorda (Marsh).

Lucas conceived the idea for the film in 1972, approaching Howard to direct during the post-production phase of Cocoon in 1985. Bob Dolman was brought in to write the screenplay, coming up with seven drafts that Lucas was actively involved in developing. It was finished in late 1986. It was then set up at Metro-Goldwyn-Mayer and principal photography began in April 1987, finishing the following October. The majority of filming took place in Dinorwic quarry in Wales with some at Elstree Studios in Hertfordshire, as well as a small section in New Zealand. Industrial Light & Magic created the visual effects and animation sequences, which led to a revolutionary breakthrough with digital morphing technology.

The film was released by MGM/UA Distribution Co. on May 20, 1988 to mixed reviews from critics with praise for the visual effects, humour, character designs and Warwick Davis' performance, but criticism for its direction, pacing, tone and story. It grossed $137.6 million worldwide against a $35 million budget. While not the blockbuster some expected, it turned a profit, based on international box office returns and strong home video and television returns. It received two Academy Award nominations. A television series that served as a sequel to the film was released on Disney+ in 2022.

== Plot ==
The evil sorceress, Queen Bavmorda of Nockmaar, hears of a prophecy that a child with a special rune birthmark will bring about her downfall. She imprisons all pregnant women in her realm. The child is born. Her mother persuades the midwife, Ethna, to smuggle the baby out of the castle. Bavmorda sends her Nockmaar Hounds after the midwife. Ethna sets the baby adrift on a tangle of dried grass in a river before falling prey to the hounds. Bavmorda sends an army led by General Kael and her daughter, Sorsha, to hunt down the baby.

Downriver, at a village of Nelwyn (a race of dwarves), the baby is found by the children of farmer and aspiring sorcerer Willow Ufgood, and his family takes her in. At a festival, a Nockmaar hound arrives and attacks cradles. After Nelwyn warriors kill it, Willow presents the baby to the village leader, High Aldwin, as a possible reason for the hound's appearance. High Aldwin orders the baby must return to a Daikini (the Nelwyn's name for "tall people") family, so Willow and other volunteers set out with the baby to find one.

At a crossroads, they find Madmartigan, a Daikini mercenary trapped in a crow's cage, who offers to take the baby in exchange for his freedom. Most of Willow's party think they should give him the baby, but Willow and his friend, Meegosh, refuse, so the others leave for home. After meeting Madmartigan's old comrade, Airk, leading an army to attack Nockmaar forces, Willow agrees to Madmartigan's terms.

On the way home, Willow and Meegosh discover that some brownies have stolen the baby, and pursue them. They are captured by the brownies, but Fairy Queen Cherlindrea frees them and explains the baby is Elora Danan, the foretold Princess of Tir Asleen. She gives Willow a magic wand and sends him in the company of two brownies, Franjean and Rool, to find the enchantress, Fin Raziel. Willow sends Meegosh home. At a tavern, he re-encounters Madmartigan, who is disguising himself as a woman to hide from his lover's husband, Llug. Sorsha and Kael's soldiers arrive, and Madmartigan is revealed as a man to Llug, who starts a brawl. Willow and Madmartigan escape with Elora.

Madmartigan allows Willow to follow him to the lake where Raziel lives. They are captured, along with Raziel, who had been turned into a possum by Bavmorda. Willow tries to restore her, but turns her into a rook instead. Franjean accidentally doses Madmartigan with love dust, causing him to declare his undying love to a skeptical Sorsha. Fleeing, Willow's party finds Airk and the remnants of his army. When the Nockmaar army pursues, Madmartigan takes Sorsha hostage. They flee once more, but Sorsha escapes.

Willow's party arrives at Tir Asleen, only to find it cursed and overrun with trolls. Kael's army arrives, and Madmartigan and Willow attempt to fend them off. Willow turns Raziel into a goat and accidentally turns a troll into an Eborsisk, a giant two-headed monster. In the ensuing chaos, Kael captures Elora. Sorsha, realizing she loves Madmartigan, defects to his side. Airk's army arrives, but Kael escapes with Elora and makes his way to Nockmaar Castle, where Bavmorda prepares a ritual to banish Elora into oblivion.

Willow's party and Airk's army travel to Nockmaar Castle, but upon their arrival, Bavmorda casts a spell turning them all into pigs. Willow, having used the wand to protect himself, finally restores Raziel to her human form. She reverses Bavmorda's spell, and Willow's army tricks their way into the castle. Kael slays Airk, and Madmartigan avenges him. Willow, Sorsha and Raziel confront Bavmorda in the ritual chamber. Bavmorda incapacitates Raziel and Sorsha. Willow uses sleight-of-hand to trick Bavmorda into thinking he transported Elora to another dimension. Bavmorda, unnerved, moves to attack him, but accidentally completes the ritual while standing next to the altar, banishing herself.

During celebrations at the restored Tir Asleen, Willow is gifted a spellbook by Raziel. Leaving Elora in the care of Madmartigan and Sorsha, Willow returns home to his village and family in triumph.

== Cast ==
- Warwick Davis as Willow Ufgood, a Nelwyn farmer and aspiring sorcerer.
- Val Kilmer as Madmartigan, a boastful mercenary swordsman who helps Willow on his quest, falling in love with Sorsha.
- Kate and Ruth Greenfield and Rebecca Bearman as Elora Danan, an infant princess who is prophesied to bring about Bavmorda's downfall.
- Joanne Whalley as Sorsha, Bavmorda's warrior daughter, who falls in love with Madmartigan.
- Jean Marsh as Bavmorda, the villainous queen of Nockmaar, a powerful dark sorceress and the mother of Sorsha.
- Patricia Hayes as Fin Raziel, an elderly sorceress cursed as a brushtail possum by Bavmorda and banished to an island.
- Billy Barty as High Aldwin, the Nelwyn wizard who commissions Willow to go on his journey.
- Pat Roach as Kael, the villainous high commander of Bavmorda's army.
- Gavan O'Herlihy as Airk Thaughbaer, the military commander of the destroyed kingdom of Galladoorn who shares a mixed friendship with Madmartigan.
- Kevin Pollak and Rick Overton as Rool and Franjean, a brownie duo who also serve as comic relief in Willow's journey.
- David J. Steinberg as Meegosh, Willow's closest friend who accompanies Willow partway on his journey.
- Mark Northover as Burglekutt, the leader of the Nelwyn village council.
- Phil Fondacaro as Vohnkar, a Nelwyn warrior who accompanies Willow partway on his journey.
- Maria Holvöe as Cherlindrea, a fairy queen who resides in the forest and updates Willow on the importance of his quest.
- Julie Peters as Kiaya Ufgood, Willow's wife and a loving mother who is enthusiastic in caring for Elora.
- Mark Vandebrake as Ranon Ufgood, Willow and Kiaya's son.
- Dawn Downing as Mims Ufgood, Willow and Kiaya's daughter.
- Malcolm Dixon as a Nelwyn warrior.
- Tony Cox as a Nelwyn warrior.
- Zulema Dene as Ethna, the midwife.
- Jennifer Guy as The Wench, Madmartigan's lover.
- Ron Tarr as Llug, The Wench's husband.
- Sallyanne Law as Elora Danan's mother.
- Kenny Baker and Jack Purvis as Nelwyn Band Members (uncredited)

== Production ==
=== Development ===
George Lucas conceived the idea for the film (originally titled Munchkins) in 1972. Similarly to his intent in Star Wars, he created "a number of well-known mythological situations for a young audience". During the production of Return of the Jedi in 1982, Lucas approached Warwick Davis, who was portraying Wicket the Ewok, about playing Willow Ufgood. Five years passed before he was actually cast in the role. Lucas "thought it would be great to use a little person in a lead role. A lot of my movies are about a little guy against the system, and this was just a more literal interpretation of that idea."

Lucas explained that he had to wait until the mid-1980s to make the film because visual effects technology was finally advanced enough to execute his vision. Meanwhile, actor-turned-director Ron Howard was looking to do a fantasy film. He was at Industrial Light & Magic during the post-production phase of Cocoon, when he was first approached by Lucas to direct Willow. He had previously starred in Lucas's American Graffiti, and Lucas felt that he and Howard shared a symbiotic relationship similar to the one he enjoyed with Steven Spielberg. Howard nominated Bob Dolman to write the screenplay based on Lucas's story. Dolman had worked with him on a 1983 television pilot called Little Shots that had not resulted in a series, and Lucas admired Dolman's work on the sitcom WKRP in Cincinnati.

Dolman joined Howard and Lucas at Skywalker Ranch for a series of lengthy story conferences, and wrote seven drafts of his script between the spring and fall of 1986. Pre-production began in late 1986. Various major film studios turned down the chance to distribute and cofinance it with Lucasfilm because they believed the fantasy genre was unsuccessful. This was largely due to films such as Krull, Legend, Dragonslayer and Labyrinth. Lucas took it to Metro-Goldwyn-Mayer (MGM), which was headed by Alan Ladd Jr. Ladd and Lucas shared a relationship as far back as the mid-1970s, when Ladd, running 20th Century Fox, greenlit Lucas's idea for Star Wars. However, in 1986, MGM was facing financial troubles, and major investment in a fantasy film was perceived as a risk. Ladd advanced half of the $35 million budget in return for theatrical and television rights, leaving Lucasfilm with home video and pay television rights to offer in exchange for the other half. RCA/Columbia Pictures Home Video paid $15 million to Lucas in exchange for the video rights.

Though Lucas had now been set on having Warwick Davis play the lead role for five years, Howard objected that at 17 years old, Davis was too young to believably portray a father of two children. As such, Davis had to go through four rounds of auditions, during which dozens of other actors vied for the role of Willow Ufgood. In the final audition, Davis performed alongside Val Kilmer, who was auditioning for the role of Madmartigan. Impressed by the chemistry between Davis and Kilmer, Lucas and Howard told them that they had won their roles.

Willow would be the first film in which audiences would see Davis's face; in all his previous films he had worn creature costumes, which demanded an exaggerated form of acting so that the character's emotions would be recognizable despite the costume. In addition to having to master more subtle acting techniques, Davis had to learn horse riding (despite having a fear of horses), sword fighting, and parenting skills such as how to hold a baby and change diapers, as well as take voice coaching to take the edge off his English accent, which the producers feared American audiences would have difficulty understanding.

Lucas named the character of General Kael (Pat Roach) after film critic Pauline Kael, a fact that was not lost on Kael in her printed review of the film. She referred to General Kael as an "homage a moi". Similarly, the two-headed dragon was called an "Eborsisk" after film critics Gene Siskel and Roger Ebert. Cherlindrea was named after three people: Ron Howard's wife Cheryl, George Lucas's girlfriend Linda Ronstadt, and Bob Doleman's wife Andrea Martin.

=== Filming ===
Principal photography began on April 2, 1987, and ended the following October. Interior footage took place at Elstree Studios in Hertfordshire, England, while location shooting took place in Dinorwic quarry, Wales and New Zealand. Lucas initially visualized shooting the film similar to Return of the Jedi, with studio scenes at Elstree and locations in Northern California, but the idea eventually faded. However, some exteriors were done around Skywalker Ranch and on location at Burney Falls, near Mount Shasta. The Chinese government refused Lucas the chance for a brief location shoot. He then sent a group of photographers to South China to photograph specific scenery, which was then used for background blue screen footage. Tongariro National Park in New Zealand was chosen to house Bavmorda's castle.

Some of the waterfalls scenes for the movie were shot at Burney Falls in Northern California, although Powerscourt Waterfall in Ireland was also used for other scenes.

Davis said that he got along well with Kilmer, whose unreserved and outlandish sense of humor helped set Davis at ease during the often demanding filming. Some of Madmartigan's dialogue and physical antics were improvised by Kilmer, including "No, don't! Don't! There's a peck here with an acorn pointed at me!"

Patricia Hayes played Fin Raziel in all her forms, slightly changing her voice to suit each of the animals her character was transformed into.

The scene where Madmartigan confesses his love for Sorsha was shot early in production. Val Kilmer and Joanne Whalley (who played Sorsha) began dating during the filming, and Howard, suspecting that their real life relationship might bring out more romantic tension, had the scene reshot. Despite the reshoot, Kilmer admitted he felt that he never got the confession scene right.

=== Visual effects and design ===
Lucasfilm's Industrial Light & Magic (ILM) created the visual effects and animation sequences. To create Cherlindrea, Maria Holvöe was filmed in slow motion with fans blowing her white robes, and the footage greatly overexposed to make her appear gleaming and difficult to make out. Since she was shot isolated on a black background, moving the camera about during filming created the illusion of her flying.

The death dogs were portrayed by a remote-controlled animatronic in close ups and by two trained rottweilers in full costume for all other footage.

The brownies were filmed performing on oversized sets for some sequences, but in most cases they were filmed on blue screen sets and then composited into the main footage.

For Willow's "disappearing pig" trick, the pig (and later the infant playing Elora Danan) was replaced with balloons rigged with small explosives, which would pop the balloons right as Warwick Davis flung out the blanket.

Willow tries to restore Fin Raziel to human form.

The script called for Willow to restore Fin Raziel (Patricia Hayes) from a goat to her human form. Willow recites what he thinks is the appropriate spell, but turns the goat into an ostrich, a peacock, a tortoise and, finally, a tiger, before returning her to normal. ILM VFX supervisor Dennis Muren considered using CGI stop-motion animation for the scene. He also explained that another traditional and practical way in the late 1980s to execute this sequence would have been through the use of an optical dissolve with cutaways at various stages.

Muren found both stop-motion and optical effects to be too technically challenging and decided that the transformation scene would be a perfect opportunity for ILM to create advances with digital morphing technology. He proposed filming each animal, and the actress doubling for Hayes, and then feeding the images into a computer program developed by Doug Smythe. The program would then create a smooth transition from one stage to another before outputting the result back onto film. Smythe began development of the necessary software in September 1987. By March 1988, Muren and fellow designer David Allen achieved what would represent a breakthrough for computer-generated imagery (CGI). The techniques developed for the sequence were later utilized by ILM for Indiana Jones and the Last Crusade, Terminator 2: Judgment Day and Star Trek VI: The Undiscovered Country.

The other transformation sequences in the film, including Fin Raziel's earlier transformations, used more traditional special effects. Fin Raziel's transformation into a rook and the troll's transformation into a eborsisk were done with models rigged with wires and bladders to pull apart and contort into different shapes, with cutaways used to hide the replacement of models with different ones.

For the pig transformation sequence, the actors were outfitted with prosthetics and masks made of foam rubber and plasticine which were molded to their individual faces and then glued on. Since creating full transformations for all 200 actors in the army was not practical, the sequence primarily focuses on a handful of actors, while the rest were simply outfitted with pull-on pig masks and jackets and shown only in wide-angle shots so the audience would not be able to discern their less realistic costuming.

The head of ILM's animation department, Wes Takahashi, supervised the film's animation sequences.

== Soundtrack ==
Willow

Soundtrack album by James Horner
- Released: 1988
- Genre: Film music
- Length: 69:23
- Label: Virgin
- Producers: James Horner, Shawn Murphy

The film score was composed and conducted by James Horner and performed by the London Symphony Orchestra. According to Horner, "I am a musicologist, a doctor of music. Therefore I listened to, studied and analysed a lot of music. I also enjoy metaphors, the art of quoting and of cycles. The harmonic draft of the Willow score, and most particularly its spiritual side, came from such a cycle, from such mythology and music history that I was taught, and that I myself convey with my own emotions and compositions."

Eclectic influences on the score include Leoš Janáček's Glagolitic Mass, Wolfgang Amadeus Mozart's "Requiem", "The Nine Splendid Stags" from Béla Bartók, Edvard Grieg's "Arabian Dance" for the theater play Peer Gynt, and compositions by Sergei Prokofiev.

"Willow's Theme" purposefully (see Horner's quote above) contains a reworking/alteration of part of the theme of the first movement ("Lebhaft") of Robert Schumann's Symphony No. 3 referencing it, while "Elora Danan's Theme" shows a reference to the Bulgarian folk song "Mir Stanke Le" (Мир Станке ле), also known as the "Harvest Song from Thrace".

Track listing

1. "Elora Danan" – 9:45
2. "Escape from the Tavern" – 5:04
3. "Willow's Journey Begins" – 5:26
4. "Canyon of Mazes" – 7:52
5. "Tir Asleen" – 10:47
6. "Willow's Theme" – 3:54
7. "Bavmorda's Spell is Cast" – 18:11
8. "Willow the Sorcerer" – 11:55

In June 2022, Intrada released an expanded score across two CDs (Special Collection Volume ISC 476), with this track listing:

CD 1

1. "Elora Danan" – 9:45
2. "The Nelwyns" – 2:41
3. "The Nelwyns No. 2" – 2:35
4. "Death Dogs" – 2:26
5. "Willow's Journey Begins" – 5:26
6. "Bavmorda's Castle" – 1:21
7. "Airk's Army" – 3:26
8. "The Enchanted Forest" – 5:31
9. "Escape From The Tavern" – 5:04
10. "The Island" – 5:10
11. "Willow Captured" – 1:59
12. "Arrival At Snow Camp" – 1:17
13. "The Sled Ride" – 7:56

CD 2

1. "Willow's Theme" – 3:54
2. "Canyon Of Mazes" – 7:52
3. "Tir Asleen" – 10:47
4. "Bavmorda's Spell Is Cast" – 18:11
5. "Willow The Sorcerer" – 11:55

== Release ==
=== Box office ===
The film was shown and promoted at the 1988 Cannes Film Festival. It was released on May 20, 1988, in 1,209 theaters, earning $8,300,169 in its opening weekend, placing number one at the weekend box office. Lucas had hoped it would earn as much money as E.T. the Extra-Terrestrial, but the film faced early competition with Crocodile Dundee II, Big and Rambo III. Grossing $57.3 million at the box office in the United States and Canada, it was not the blockbuster hit insiders had anticipated. The film opened in Japan in July and grossed $16.7 million in its first seven weeks, MGM's highest-grossing film in Japan at the time and went on to gross $20.3 million there. It performed well in other international markets, grossing $80.3 million for a worldwide total of $137.6 million. Strong home video and television sales added to its profits.

=== Critical reception ===
Willow was released to mixed reviews from critics. On the review aggregator website Rotten Tomatoes, 53% of 64 critics' reviews are positive, with an average rating of 6.1/10. The website's consensus reads: "State-of-the-art special effects and an appealing performance from Warwick Davis can't quite save Willow from its slow pace and generic story." On Metacritic, the film has a score of 47 out of 100 based on 12 critics, indicating "mixed or average reviews". Audiences polled by CinemaScore gave the film an average grade of "A-" on an A+ to F scale.

Janet Maslin from The New York Times praised Lucas's storytelling, but was critical of Ron Howard's direction. "Howard appears to have had his hands full in simply harnessing the special effects," Maslin said.

Siskel & Ebert gave the film two thumbs down on their television show At the Movies. Ebert's print review in the Chicago Sun-Times was a mixed 2.5 stars out of a possible 4. He wrote that while the special effects were good, the core story was unengaging and the characters flat: "There can be no true suspense in a movie where even the characters seem to be inspired by other movies."

Desson Thomson writing in The Washington Post, explained "Rob Reiner's similar fairytale adventure The Princess Bride (which the cinematographer Adrian Biddle also shot) managed to evoke volumes more without razzle-dazzle. It's a sad thing to be faulting Lucas, maker of the Star Wars trilogy and Raiders of the Lost Ark, for forgetting the tricks of entertainment." Mike Clark in USA Today wrote that "the rainstorm wrap-up, in which Good edges Evil is like Led Zeppelin Meets The Wild Bunch. The film is probably too much for young children and possibly too much of the same for cynics. But any 6–13-year-old who sees this may be bitten by the ’movie bug’ for life."

=== Accolades ===
At the 61st Academy Awards, the film was nominated for Sound Effects Editing and Visual Effects. It won Best Costume Design at the 16th Saturn Awards, where it was also nominated for Warwick Davis for Best Performance by a Younger Actor (lost to Fred Savage for Vice Versa) and Jean Marsh for Best Supporting Actress (lost to Sylvia Sidney for Beetlejuice). It also lost Best Fantasy Film and the Hugo Award for Best Dramatic Presentation to Who Framed Roger Rabbit. It was also nominated for two Golden Raspberry Awards including Worst Screenplay, which lost to Cocktail and Worst Supporting Actor for Billy Barty, who lost to Dan Aykroyd for Caddyshack II at the 9th Golden Raspberry Awards.

=== Home media ===
The film was first released on VHS, Betamax, Video 8 and LaserDisc on November 22, 1988 by RCA/Columbia Pictures Home Video. The film also had multiple re-releases on VHS in the 1990s under Columbia TriStar Home Video as well as a widescreen LaserDisc in 1995. 20th Century Fox Home Entertainment re-released the film on VHS and on DVD for the first time as a "special edition" on November 27, 2001, both of which were THX certified. The release included an audio commentary by Warwick Davis and two "making of" featurettes. In the commentary, Davis confirms that there were a number of "lost scenes" previously rumored to have been deleted from it including a battle in the valley, Willow battling a boy who transforms into a fish-like monster in a lake while retrieving Fin Raziel, and an extended sorceress duel at the climax. George Lucas and 20th Century Fox Home Entertainment released the film on Blu-ray disc on March 12, 2013, with an all-new digital transfer overseen by Lucasfilm. Following Disney's acquisition of Lucasfilm (and 21st Century Fox's assets), the film was re-released with the Metro-Goldwyn-Mayer logo at the beginning by Walt Disney Studios Home Entertainment on Blu-ray, DVD and Digital (for the first time) on January 29, 2019, and was later made available to stream on Disney+ when the service launched on November 12, 2019. The 4K UHD Blu-ray of the film was released by Sony Pictures Home Entertainment on December 10, 2024.

== Other media ==
=== Board game ===
In 1988, Tor Books released The Willow Game, a two- to six-player adventure board game based on the film and designed by Greg Costikyan.

=== Video games ===
Three video games based on the film were released. Mindscape published an action game in 1988 for Amiga, Atari ST, Commodore 64 and MS-DOS. Japanese game developer Capcom published two different games in 1989 based on the film; the first Willow is a platform game for arcades and the second Willow game is a role-playing game for the Nintendo Entertainment System.

=== Novels ===
Wayland Drew adapted Lucas's story into a film novel, providing additional background information to several major characters, while Joan Vinge adapted the story into another novelization. Both included various additional scenes, including an encounter with a lake monster near Raziel's island which was filmed, but ultimately not used in the movie. A segment of that scene's filmed material can be found in the DVD's "Making of Willow" documentary.

Lucas outlined the Chronicles of the Shadow War trilogy to follow the film and hired comic book writer/novelist Chris Claremont to adapt them into a series of books. They take place about fifteen years after the original film and feature the teenage Elora Danan as a central character.

1. Shadow Moon (1995) ISBN 0-553-57285-7
2. Shadow Dawn (1996) ISBN 0-553-57289-X
3. Shadow Star (2000) ISBN 0-553-57288-1

=== Television series ===
Beginning in 2005, Lucas and Davis discussed the possibility of a television series serving as a sequel to Willow. Throughout the years, in various interviews, Davis expressed interest in reprising his role as the title character.

In May 2018, Howard confirmed that there were ongoing discussions regarding a sequel, while confirming the project would not be called Willow 2. In 2019, Ron Howard announced that a sequel television series was currently in development, with intentions for the series to be exclusively released on the Disney+ streaming service. Jonathan Kasdan would be involved in the television series, while Warwick Davis would reprise his role from the original film. Creator George Lucas would not participate in this series.

In October 2020, the series was officially green-lit by Disney+, with Ron Howard set to executive produce the series alongside Kasdan, Wendy Mericle and Jon M. Chu. Chu would direct the series first episode, with Kasdan and Mericle serving as showrunners, Warwick Davis reprising his role as Willow Ufgood, and Bob Dolman serving as a consulting producer. In December 2020, it was announced the show would be released in 2022. In January 2021, Chu left his directorial duties due to production moving towards the summer and it corresponding with birth of his next child.

That same month, it was revealed that Jonathan Entwistle had officially been hired to replace Chu as director, with filming commencing in Spring 2021 in Wales. However, due to production delays as a result of a recasting, Entwistle also exited the series, with Stephen Woolfenden coming in to direct the first two episodes of the series.

In November 2021, a promo video featuring the cast of the series was released for Disney+ Day. The new live-action series premiered on November 30, 2022, on Disney+. The series was cancelled in March 2023 and was removed from streaming on May 26, 2023.

== Bibliography ==
- Drew, Wayland (January 1988). Willow: A Novel. Del Rey Books. ISBN 978-0-345-35195-1. (Novelization of the film)
- Duffy, Jo (January 1988). Willow. St. Martin's Press. ISBN 978-0-87135-367-2. (Comic book adaptation of the film)
- Varney, Allen W.; Goldberg, Eric (September 1988). The Willow Sourcebook. St. Martin's Press. ISBN 978-0-312-93083-7.
