= Captain Commando (character) =

Fictional Capcom mascot

- Capcom character
- Captain Commando in Project X Zone 2
- First appearance: "Captain Commando Challenge Series" (1986)
- First game: Captain Commando (1991)
- Designed by: Akira "Akiman" Yasuda (Captain Commando)
- Voiced by: Ryōtarō Okiayu (Namco × Capcom, Project X Zone 2)

In-universe information
- Origin: America

Captain Commando (Japanese: キャプテンコマンドー, Hepburn: Kyaputen Komandō) is a mascot character created by Capcom's North American branch to advertise their Nintendo Entertainment System games. The character was used from 1986 to 1988, before undergoing a redesign in 1989 with the campaign cancelled shortly after. The character's name is a reference to Capcom itself, with the first three letters of each part spelling out "Cap Com". During this campaign, the North American instruction manual for Section Z stated he was the protagonist of the title.

In 1991, when developing their first four-player beat 'em up title, Capcom's developers rediscovered the character and built the game Captain Commando around him, with the character itself reimagined by artist Akira "Akiman" Yasuda and stylized after American comic book heroes. This incarnation of the character would go on to be used in the Marvel vs. Capcom series and several other games, as well as a prequel manga series. In 2025, he was stated to be part of Capcom's Street Fighter franchise.

Captain Commando has been considered a failed mascot, with Capcom themselves declaring he was no longer used as such by the company in 1996. Others were critical of his design, feeling it was uninspired and overpowered, and inferior to other Capcom mascot characters such as Mega Man. Despite these criticisms, the character has continued to be used in advertisements and merchandise, and seen praise as both an icon and helping to establish Capcom's corporate personality early on.

== Appearances ==
The character's original design (left) as part of the "Captain Commando Challenge Series" advertising campaign. It would be used by Capcom USA from 1986 to 1989, before being redesigned as an astronaut (right) and retired shortly after.

Developed by Capcom's North American branch in 1986, Captain Commando as a character was designed as a marketing tool for the company's Nintendo Entertainment System library, unifying the titles as the "Captain Commando Challenge Series". Used on the back of the boxes and in instruction manuals for the games thanking the player for their purchase, the character was depicted as a white haired man with a ray gun in each hand, wearing a high collar coat and sporting two large gold medallions with a "C" imprinted on them on his neck. The character's name was a play on the company's, with the first three letters of each part spelling "Cap Com".

Home releases of titles such as Mega Man, 1942, Commando, and Section Z utilized the character, with the manual of the last stating that Captain Commando was the game's protagonist. Captain Commando was redesigned in 1986, now appearing as a brown-haired astronaut wearing a silver spacesuit with his name printed on it, and featuring a monkey on his shoulder. This incarnation of the character was included on home releases of Mega Man 2 and other titles from that year. However, due to the rising popularity of characters such as Mega Man and Street Fighter series protagonist Ryu, the character was seen as no longer necessary and the campaign was discontinued.

=== In video games and related media ===
In 1991, when looking for source material for what would be Capcom's first four-player beat 'em up game, they rediscovered the Captain Commando character. Lead designer Junichi Ohno, however, felt that the character's contemporary astronaut concept would not be viable in a beat 'em up game, and instead wanted to reimagine him as an "ultimate astronaut". Commando was redesigned by artist Akira "Akiman" Yasuda, who felt the original design was "uncool" and redesigned the character based on an American comic book aesthetic. The game was intended to be a "life-size space opera", and Yasuda was influenced by sources such as the American science fiction series Lensman and pulp fiction hero Captain Future. With the addition of their own original characters for the title, according to Ohno, the only "American" thing about the game by the end was Captain Commando himself.

This incarnation of Captain Commando is a blonde American man with short hair slicked back and a visor over his eyes, standing 6 feet (182 cm) tall. His outfit consists of a blue jumpsuit with a white breastplate that has a gold star on the right pectoral, matching boots with orange highlights on his feet, and gauntlets on his arms that have emphasized knuckles and cables extending between the forearm and bicep parts. Parts of his design were also inspired by a space sheriff character in the manga Battle Royal High School. The character in question featured large round shoulders; Yasuda, hoping to start a trend, used large square shoulders for his character designs in the title instead. This later inspired the developers of the fighting game Galaxy Fight to use similar in their own title.

Captain Commando would later appear in Marvel vs. Capcom: Clash of Super Heroes, a crossover title between Capcom and the Marvel Comics franchise, at the suggestion of lead designer Atsushi Tomita, who felt the character "carried the company's name on his back". Yasuda assisted by providing reference art and clay models of the character for the animation team. While the character is voiced, no voice actor is credited. He has also appeared in other games, including Namco × Capcom and Project X Zone 2, where he is voiced by Ryōtarō Okiayu, Adventure Quiz: Capcom World 2, and the SNK vs. Capcom: Card Fighters Clash series. In print media, he appeared in a prequel self-titled manga series published in Gamest magazine, where he is given the civilian identity Mars Carlisle. The manga was later recompiled in books published by UDON Entertainment in 2012.

Noritaka Funamizu, Vice President of Research and Design for Capcom's arcade titles, stated in 1996 that Commando was no longer a mascot for the company, and that "If we had to pick a mascot, just put any Street Fighter character on there and it's Capcom!" Despite that, the character has seen continued usage in advertising and merchandise. In 2025, Street Fighter series director Takayuki Nakamura declared the Captain Commando game as part of its shared universe on social media website Twitter.

== Critical reception ==
Captain Commando received mixed reception since his debut, and has been cited as an example of a failed mascot. Matthew Byrd of Den of Geek stated that while Captain Commando was designed to be the "Nick Fury-like character" that served as a uniting pillar for their streak of great games, he felt putting the character in his own game backfired due to overhyping the character. Calling it a mass-market conglomeration of vaguely cool concepts, while he acknowledged the game was good, he felt it was in no way going to surpass the cultural impact of titles such as Mega Man. Although Commando was later incorporated into Marvel vs. Capcom, Byrd believed that the damage was already done. Luke McKinney of Retro magazine was more aggressive, describing the character as "when corporate trademark replaces creative inspiration", particularly voicing disdain for how the character felt overpowered compared to his opponents. In this manner, combined with his lore, McKinney felt Commando came across as more "bored bully than a hero".

In contrast, Devon Lord-Moncrief of Comic Book Resources spoke positively of the mascot, describing the original incarnation as a "strange fusion of anime and Western comics", and praising astronaut redesign as looking "stern, authoritative, and ready for action". He felt the character served its purpose, but also that Captain Commando did something other Capcom mascots did not by interacting directly with the consumer and players. Lord-Moncrief further lamented that while the character was still frequently used, he had not starred a stand-alone title since his arcade debut, something he hoped would eventually change in light of other beat 'em up titles such as Double Dragon seeing their own revivals.

Luke Plunkett from Kotaku called the character his favorite Capcom hero, describing him as "made entirely of blonde hair, sunglasses and 100% pure awesome". He further called him the greatest male video game character of all time, despite not actually appearing in a video game for some time, and compared him to mashups of other pulp culture icons in the same vein as Apogee Entertainment's Duke Nukem. Plunkett acknowledged at the same time that others did not share his sentiment, and opined that he was not missed due to the large roster of figurehead characters the modern Capcom company had at its disposal. Regardless, Plunkett was thankful to see the character still returning in later titles, adding "you can't keep a good character down—especially when it belongs to Capcom".

Spanner Spencer writing for The Escapist discussed the character in an examination of the "Jet-Pack Hero Trilogy", an unofficial name for Capcom's early titles consisting of Section-Z, Hyper Dyne Side Arms, and Forgotten Worlds. He wrote that while he saw the character as a shallow attempt to compete with Nintendo protagonist Mario, Commando helped drive a particular landmark for the company due to being cast as the North American protagonist of Section Z. Praising how Capcom recognized the need for a mascot character, he felt they could be forgiven for relying on the "action-man cliche", adding that Commando helped established a foundation for many of the company's games through advertisements and instruction manuals thanking players for buying a Capcom game. He further stated that while the character had faded from popularity by the time of the Captain Commando game release, the company continued to use him. Spencer stated that Commando, alongside the other "Jet-Pack Hero" protagonists, helped establish Capcom's personality as a company, and that of the "unsung heroes of videogame history, few have yielded such rich and diverse benefits for their creators".
