= Shadow Moon =

1995 novel by Chris Claremont and George Lucas

- Author: Chris Claremont, George Lucas
- Cover artist: Ciruelo Cabral
- Language: English
- Series: Chronicles of the Shadow War
- Genre: Fantasy literature
- Published: 1995 (Bantam Spectra)
- Publication place: United States
- Media type: Print (Hardback & Paperback)
- Pages: 464
- ISBN: 0-553-57285-7
- OCLC: 35177828
- Dewey Decimal: 813.54
- LC Class: PS3562 .U234
- Followed by: Shadow Dawn

Shadow Moon is a fantasy novel written by Chris Claremont and George Lucas. Published in 1995, it was the continuation of the 1988 motion picture Willow. This is the first book of the Chronicles of the Shadow War trilogy, followed by Shadow Dawn and Shadow Star.

== Plot ==
One year after the downfall of Queen Bavmorda, (Note: As depicted in the 1988 film Willow.) Willow Ufgood continues his life as a farmer while honing his sorcery. One night, he dreams of riding on the back of a dragon named Calan Dineer to Tir Asleen. There, he reunites with Madmartigan and Sorsha, who rename him "Thorn Drumheller". In honor of Elora Danan's first birthday, he gifts her a stuffed bear which transfers a portion of his magic resistance to her. When he awakes, he discovers an apocalyptic cataclysm has wiped out several areas of the land, including Tir Asleen, killing Madmartigan and Sorsha. The High Aldwyn encourages him to follow the path of a wizard and investigate the cause of this destruction. Willow leaves Nelwyn Vale and adopts the name Thorn.

Twelve years later, he arrives in the area where Tir Asleen once stood. Thorn, along with his brownies - Franjean and Rool - and eagles, Anele and Bastian, are attacked by a pack of death dogs. They ward them off with the help of Geryn Havilhand, a trooper from Angwyn. Geryn informs Thorn that he is en route back there to celebrate Elora Danan's ascension to the throne on her thirteenth birthday. He muses whether Willow Ufgood, Elora's godfather, will be present. Thorn, not revealing his identity, sets off to Angwyn with his ship-sailing companions Morag and Maulroon, alongside Geryn and Wyr captain Ryn.

Upon arrival, Thorn is apprehended. An aide to Castellan Mohdri - leader of the kingdom's Thunder Riders - tells him that Willow is already in Angwyn, and warned of an impostor. Believing Thorn to be this deceiver, he is thrown into a dungeon. He escapes and finds his way to Elora's tower. Reuniting with her, he discovers she has become a spoiled, disagreeable child. After fleeing from her, Thorn receives an offer from a demon who dwells in the dungeon. It proposes helping Thorn escape if he implants the consciousness of its offspring into the body of a comatose Daikini woman. Thorn reluctantly agrees, and the offspring - Khory Bannefin - is reborn into the body. Thorn escapes in time to apprehend the false Willow at Elora's ceremony, where one ruler from each of the twelve realms is bearing witness. Thorn dubs this opponent "The Deceiver" before it kills Kieran Dineer, who is representing the dragon race. The skirmish leaves Angwyn encased in ice. Thorn flees with Elora, Geryn, Khory, Morag and Maulroon. Mohdri vows to capture the fugitives with Angwyn's princess Anakerie.

Thorn tries unsuccessfully to bond with Elora, who does not believe he is the true Willow. The group are captured by a cluster of assassins who hold them captive at an ale house. Ryn arrives and fights them off with Khory. Believing that travel by land will only lead them to Thunder Riders, Thorn proposes they continue by sea. Morag and Maulroon captain the group on their ship, which is met by a violent storm. Maulroon is killed despite Elora's success in warding it off with her magic. The ship reaches the Fairy Lands where Cherlindrea previously gifted Thorn his wand. (Note: As depicted in the 1988 film Willow.) Thorn finds the use of magic acts as a beacon for The Deceiver to trace the group. Elora wards off a swarm of Fire Drakes that it sends. A dying Stag Lord informs Thorn that since Elora thus stopped fire, the world will be reborn in ice.

Mohdri and Anakerie arrive. Geryn reveals he is an ally to Mohdri, who he joins in pursuing Thorn, Elora, Khory, Ryn, Rool, Franjean and the eagles to a dormant volcano near Doumhall. The Deceiver also arrives. It attempts to implant its soul into Elora's body, but is turned to stone by Thorn. It escapes into the body of Mohdri, who it begins to use as a host. It fights Khory, Ryn and Thorn, who reaches out to the volcano. Recognising that The Deceiver is also its enemy, it transforms into an active one. Anele and Bastian help Thorn and Elora ward off The Deceiver, while Geryn sacrifices himself as a show of loyalty to the Castellan.

In the aftermath, Elora, knowing Thorn to be the true Willow, deduces that the bear he gifted her twelve years ago protected her from the Cataclysm. Declaring that a "Shadow War" has now begun, Thorn expresses hope that he and Elora will receive new allies who can aid in their fight against The Deceiver.

== Reception ==
RPGnet's reviewer described Shadow Moon as "good, solid and in part confusing as hell. Claremont and Lucas pack the details in and ratchet up the drama with unbelievable stunts and rescues."

In 2019–20, Shadow Moon featured on the podcast series 372 Pages We'll Never Get Back, which reads literature of low quality. The two hosts, Conor Lastowka and Michael J. Nelson, described it as the worst book they had read so far, even worse than Sean Penn's Bob Honey Who Just Do Stuff.
