= Willow (NES video game) =

1989 video game

- North American cover art
- Developer: Capcom
- Publisher: Capcom
- Director: Akira Kitamura
- Producer: Tokuro Fujiwara
- Artists: Hironori Matsumura; Masako Honma; Naoya Tomita
- Writer: Akira Kitamura
- Composer: Harumi Fujita
- Series: Willow
- Platform: Nintendo Entertainment System
- Release: JP: July 18, 1989; NA: December 1989; EU: April 11, 1993
- Genre: Action role-playing
- Mode: Single-player

Willow (Note: Japanese: ウィロー, Hepburn: U~irō) is a 1989 2D action role-playing game developed and published by Capcom for the Nintendo Entertainment System. It is loosely inspired by the 1988 film of the same name and is the second title Capcom released based on Willow that year, the first being an unrelated side scrolling arcade game. The version of Willow released for the Nintendo Entertainment System and the Famicom is an adventure game in the vein of The Legend of Zelda.

== Gameplay ==
Gameplay screenshot.

The player assumes the role of Willow Ufgood, who wages a battle against evil, wielding swords, shields, magic spells, and items to defeat enemies. Unlike the film and arcade game, Willow generally travels alone, only briefly meeting several other characters. The game contains some role-playing video game elements, as Willow gains experience and levels up from defeating enemies in real time combat. Rather than battery saving, it uses a password system instead of a save feature. There is no money system, and all items are found throughout the game.

Willow can enter homes and talk to inhabitants of the villages to receive advice as well as items like magic and weapons.

== Development ==
Willow is a 1988 film produced by George Lucas, directed by Ron Howard, and starred Warwick Davis in the title role as Willow Ufgood. Capcom developed two games based on Willow in 1989. The arcade game plays similar to Capcom's previous fantasy action platformer Ghouls n' Ghosts. The version developed for the NES is a role playing game.

Willow is part of a series of games released in the five years after the original The Legend of Zelda, which were described as "zelda clones". Other games like this include Neutopia by Hudson, Golden Axe Warrior by Sega and Crystalis by SNK.

Capcom director Yoshiki Okamoto commented that the game was part of a broader strategy of Capcom at the time to appeal to a wider audience by using established characters from other media, as their original characters could be too niche. He cited games based on Area 88 and Destiny of an Emperor as part of this strategy.

The music was composed by Harumi Fujita. She said “I put a lot of energy into the music for Willow. The producer of Willow was the same producer who made Mega Man. He was an extremely talented individual and I was elated to have the chance to write music for his game, so I put my all into it. I'm not sure how well the game itself was received, but it was fun.”

Shinji Mikami noted that when he joined Capcom in 1990, all of those who were accepted into the company got a free copy of the game.

== Release ==
The game was released for the Famicom in Japan on July 18, 1989. It was released in North America in December 1989. The game has never been re-released on any Nintendo Virtual Console, likely due to licensing issues.

== Reception ==
Reception

Review scores
Publication	Score
Famitsu	26/40
VG&CE	7/10
Hobby Consolas	75/100
VideoGame	4/5

Famitsu magazine gave it a score of 26 out of 40. Family Computer Magazine gave it a score of 21.05/30. Brazilian game magazine VideoGame gave it a score of 4 out of 5. Howard H. Wen, writing in Video Games and Computer Entertainment magazine gave it a score of 7 out of 10, praising the graphics, but was critical of the music and the complex password system which required 18 characters in both upper and lower case. Hobby Consolas magazine gave it a 75 out of 100 score.

IGN named it as the 89th best game for the NES. In the final issue of Nintendo Power, which was released in December 2012, Willow was ranked 254 out of 285 for best games ever to appear on Nintendo consoles. 1up.com called it a rather poor game inspired by The Legend of Zelda, and said Crystalis was a far better Zelda style game.
