= Chris Claremont =

American comic book writer (born 1950)

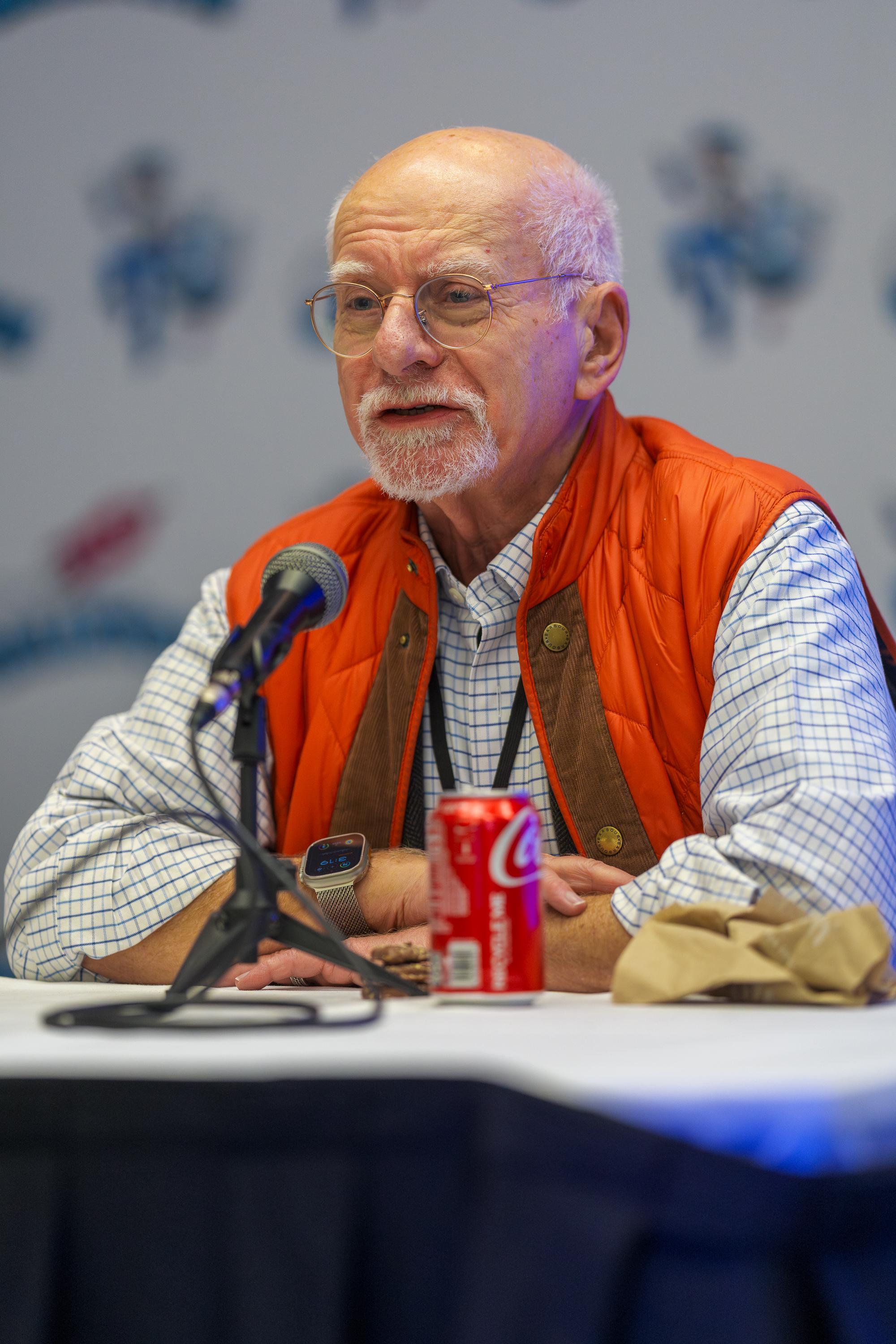
- Claremont in 2026
- Born: Christopher Simon Claremont; November 25, 1950 (age 75) London, England
- Notable works: Uncanny X-Men; New Mutants; Captain Britain; Excalibur; Wolverine; Fantastic Four; Ms. Marvel; Iron Fist; X-Treme X-Men
- Awards: Comics Buyer's Guide Fan Award: 1983, 1984, 1988, 1989, 1990; Eagle Award: 1979 and 1980; Will Eisner Award Hall of Fame (2015)
- Spouses: Bonnie Wilford (divorced) Beth Fleisher (m. 1988)
- Children: 2

Christopher Simon Claremont (/ˈklɛərmɒnt/ KLAIR-mont; born November 25, 1950) is an English-born American comic book writer and novelist. Claremont wrote for 16 years on Uncanny X-Men from 1975 to 1991, longer than that of any other writer, during which he is credited with developing strong female characters as well as introducing complex literary themes into superhero narratives, turning the once underachieving comic into one of Marvel's most popular series. During his tenure, X-Men was the best-selling comic book in the world.

During his tenure at Marvel, Claremont co-created numerous X-Men characters including Rogue, Psylocke (Betsy Braddock), Kitty Pryde/Shadowcat, Phoenix, the Brood, Lockheed, Shi'ar, Shi'ar Imperial Guard, Mystique, Destiny, Selene, William Stryker, Lady Mastermind, Emma Frost, Sage, Siryn, Jubilee, Rachel Summers, Madelyne Pryor, Moira MacTaggert, Lilandra Neramani, Shadow King, Cannonball, Warpath, Mirage, Wolfsbane, Karma, Cypher, Sabretooth, Empath, Sebastian Shaw, Donald Pierce, Avalanche, Pyro, Legion, Nimrod, Gateway, Strong Guy, Proteus, Mister Sinister, Marauders, the Purifiers, Captain Britain, Sunspot, Forge, and Gambit.

He wrote the stories "The Dark Phoenix Saga" and "Days of Future Past", on which he collaborated with John Byrne. He developed the character of Wolverine into a fan favorite. X-Men #1, the 1991 spinoff series premiere that Claremont co-wrote with Jim Lee, is the bestselling comic book of all time, according to Guinness World Records. In 2015, Claremont and Byrne were entered into the Will Eisner Award Hall of Fame.

== Early life ==
Claremont was born in London, England. His father was an internist and his mother was a pilot and caterer. Claremont is Jewish on his mother's side, and lived in a kibbutz in Israel during his youth. His family moved to the United States when he was three years old, and he was raised primarily on Long Island. Alienated by the sports-oriented suburbs, his grandmother purchased for him a subscription to Eagle when he was a child, and he grew up reading Dan Dare, finding them more exciting than the Batman and Superman comics of the 1950s and early 1960s. He read works by science fiction writers such as Robert Heinlein, as well as writers of other genres such as Rudyard Kipling and C. S. Forester.

== Career ==
=== Comics ===
==== 1969–1991 ====
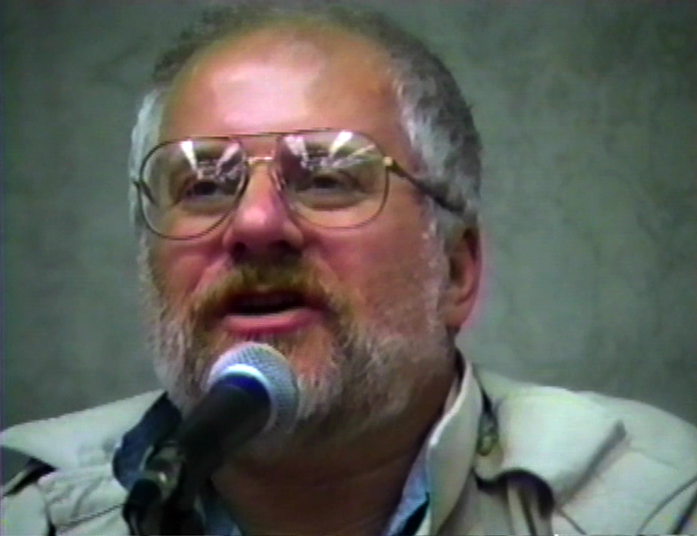
Chris Claremont at a comic convention in New York City around 1990

Claremont initially did not view the comic book industry as the place where he would make his career, as he believed the dwindling readership to be a sign that the industry was dying, and found the material being published to be uninteresting. Instead, when he began at Bard College, he did so as a political theorist, studying acting and political theory, and writing novels with the hope of becoming a director. His first professional sale was a prose story. He graduated in 1972.

Claremont's career began in 1969, as a college undergraduate, when he was hired as a gofer/editorial assistant at Marvel Comics. His first professional scripting assignment was Daredevil #102 (Aug. 1973). As an entry into regular comics writing, Claremont was given the fledgling feature "Iron Fist" in Marvel Premiere as of issue #23 (Aug. 1975). He was joined two issues later by artist John Byrne. The Claremont/Byrne team continued to work together when the character received its own self-titled series in November 1975. This title lasted 15 issues.

Though his acting career did not yield great success, he functioned well at Marvel, where he obtained a full-time position. One of the first new characters created by Claremont was Madrox the Multiple Man in Giant-Size Fantastic Four #4 (Feb. 1975). Marvel's editor-in-chief at the time, Len Wein, who recognized Claremont's enthusiasm for the new X-Men that Wein and Dave Cockrum had created in 1975, hired Claremont, a relatively young writer, to take over the series as of issue #94 (May 1975), reasoning that doing so would not draw opposition from other writers, given the book's poor standing. Claremont approached the job as a method actor, developing the characters by examining their motives, desires and individual personalities. This approach drew immediate positive reaction. According to former Marvel editor-in-chief Bob Harras, "He lived it and breathed it. He would write whole paragraphs about what people were wearing. He really got into these people's thoughts, hopes, dreams." Claremont's take on the series has been likened to writing "the Great American Novel about complex characters who just happened to fly", incorporating surprise character developments and emotional nuances amid the operatic battles that otherwise typified American superhero comics. By his own admission, Claremont acquired a reputation for taking a long time to resolve plot threads, and longtime X-Men editor Louise Simonson recounted that whenever she was at a loss for story ideas, "All I'd have to do was go through all of the plot threads that he had left for the last year or two."

Claremont introduced new supporting characters to the X-Men series including Moira MacTaggert in issue #96 and Lilandra Neramani in #97. Jean Grey a.k.a. Marvel Girl, one of Marvel's first female heroes, underwent a dramatic transformation into the extremely powerful Phoenix in issue #101. Issue #107 (Oct. 1977) saw the introduction of the Starjammers as well as the departure of artist Dave Cockrum. Claremont began his collaboration with artist John Byrne in the following issue.

During his 17 years as X-Men writer, Claremont wrote or co-wrote many classic X-Men stories, such as "The Dark Phoenix Saga" and "Days of Future Past". Comics writers and historians Roy Thomas and Peter Sanderson observed that "'The Dark Phoenix Saga' is to Claremont and Byrne what the 'Galactus Trilogy' is to Stan Lee and Jack Kirby. It is a landmark in Marvel history, showcasing its creators' work at the height of their abilities." Comics historian Les Daniels noted that "The controversial story created a sensation and The X-Men became the comic book to watch." In 2010, Comics Bulletin ranked Claremont and Byrne's run on The X-Men second on its list of the "Top 10 1970s Marvels". Claremont and artist Frank Miller crafted a Wolverine limited series in 1982. With artist Walt Simonson, Claremont produced The Uncanny X-Men and The New Teen Titans in 1982, an intercompany crossover between the top-selling Marvel and DC titles. The New Mutants were introduced by Claremont and Bob McLeod in Marvel Graphic Novel #4 (Dec. 1982) and received their own ongoing series soon after. The second X-Men film was loosely based on his 1982 X-Men graphic novel God Loves, Man Kills.

Besides his work on X-Men and its spinoffs, Claremont wrote Marvel Team-Up, Spider-Woman and Ms. Marvel during this time. He and artist John Bolton created the Marada the She-Wolf character in 1981. Claremont's stories for Marvel Team-Up included the cast of NBC's Saturday Night Live appearing in issue #74 (Oct. 1978) and the introduction of Karma, a character who later joined the New Mutants, in #100 (Dec. 1980). Claremont helped launch the Marvel Fanfare title in March 1982.

Claremont co-created numerous other important female X-Men characters, including Rogue, Betsy Braddock, Mariko Yashida, Kitty Pryde/Shadowcat, Phoenix, Mystique, Lady Mastermind, Emma Frost, Siryn, Rachel Summers, Madelyne Pryor, and Jubilee. He co-created such notable male characters as Sabretooth, Pyro, Avalanche, Strong Guy, Captain Britain, Forge, Mister Sinister, and Gambit.

Claremont launched various X-Men spin-offs, beginning with The New Mutants in 1982. The spinoffs Excalibur and Wolverine, initially written by Claremont, followed in 1987 and 1988, respectively. X-Men crossover stories written by Claremont during the latter half of his tenure on the series include "Mutant Massacre", "Fall of the Mutants", and "X-Tinction Agenda". In 1991, Marvel launched a second X-Men title simply called X-Men with Claremont and penciler Jim Lee as co-writers. X-Men #1 is still the bestselling comic book of all time, with sales of over 8.1 million copies (and nearly $7 million), according to Guinness World Records, which presented honors to Claremont at the 2010 San Diego Comic-Con. The sales figures were generated in part by publishing the issue with four different variant covers which showed different characters from the book (and later a fifth gatefold cover that combined all four), large numbers of which were purchased by retailers, who anticipated fans and speculators who would buy multiple copies in order to acquire a complete collection of the covers. Claremont left the series after the first three-issue story arc, due to clashes with editor Bob Harras.

==== 1992–present ====
The 1990s saw Claremont diversify his comics work, as he wrote for other publishers, and wrote his own creator-owned properties. In December 1991, he sent artist Whilce Portacio a proposal to illustrate Claremont's project, The Huntsman, as a creator-owned project, and when the then-new comics publisher Image Comics was announced in 1992, Claremont was named as one of its founders. However, the project was canceled when Portacio decided instead to do Wetworks. Claremont attempted to find other artist for the series, but all those in whom he was interested were either drawing X-Men or had their own projects with Image, and thus he did not become one of Image's founders. In 1992 he wrote the graphic novel Star Trek: Debt of Honor, which was illustrated by Adam Hughes. Stan Lee interviewed Claremont for episode 7 of the 1991–92 documentary series The Comic Book Greats.

In 1993, he began writing the 12-issue miniseries Aliens/Predator: Deadliest of the Species for Dark Horse Comics, which was completed in 1995. That year saw a decline in his comics output, however, as he turned his focus to writing novels, citing frustration with how the comics industry had become dominated by artists and editors. In 1994, he wrote issues #10–13 of Jim Lee and Brandon Choi's series, WildC.A.T.s at Image Comics, in which he finally introduced his creator-owned character, Huntsman.

In 1995, Claremont began writing his creator-owned series, Sovereign Seven, which was published by DC Comics, running for 36 issues until 1998.

In 1998, Claremont returned to Marvel as editorial director and the regular writer of Fantastic Four, where he created Valeria Richards. The book was pencilled by artist Salvador Larrocca and inked by Art Thibert for the entirety of his duration on the series. Claremont's run on Fantastic Four would last for 29 issues and 2 annuals, making it his longest tenure on a title outside of the X-Men. Despite outselling books such as Amazing Spider-Man and Batman, Claremont was fired by editor Bobbie Chase in early 2000, a decision that he was angered by due to his desire to remain on the title for as long as his original X-Men run. Claremont also wrote The Fantastic 4th Voyage of Sinbad in 2001, a one shot starring the Fantastic Four on an adventure with Sinbad the Sailor. The comic was pencilled Pascual Ferry.

In 2000, as part of the company's "Revolution" event, he wrote Uncanny X-Men and X-Men until he moved to X-Treme X-Men, again working with penciller Salvador Larroca. He returned to Uncanny X-Men again for a two-year run starting in 2004, while teaming up with his former Excalibur collaborator and artist, Alan Davis.

In 2004, Claremont was co-writer on JLA issues #94–99, the "Tenth Circle" story arc for DC Comics, which reunited him with his former Uncanny X-Men artist John Byrne, with Jerry Ordway as inker.

In 2007, Claremont returned to New Excalibur, writing a story arc in which the character Nocturne has a stroke. He has completed his first arc on Exiles, adding Betsy Braddock to the team.

In 2008 Claremont wrote the miniseries GeNEXT, followed by its 2009 sequel, GeNext: United. He was the writer of an X-Men Forever series which was set in an alternate universe, and focuses on the present day lives of the X-Men in a reality where Magneto never returned following the destruction of Asteroid M in X-Men #3 (December 1991). In 2010, Claremont collaborated with Italian comics artist Milo Manara on X-Women.

As of 2014 Claremont was under an exclusive contract for Marvel. In April of that year, Marvel launched a Nightcrawler series with Claremont as writer, which he finished in March 2015. He re-united with his former New Mutants artist Bill Sienkiewicz for the oneshot New Mutants: War Children in 2019.

==== Writing style ====
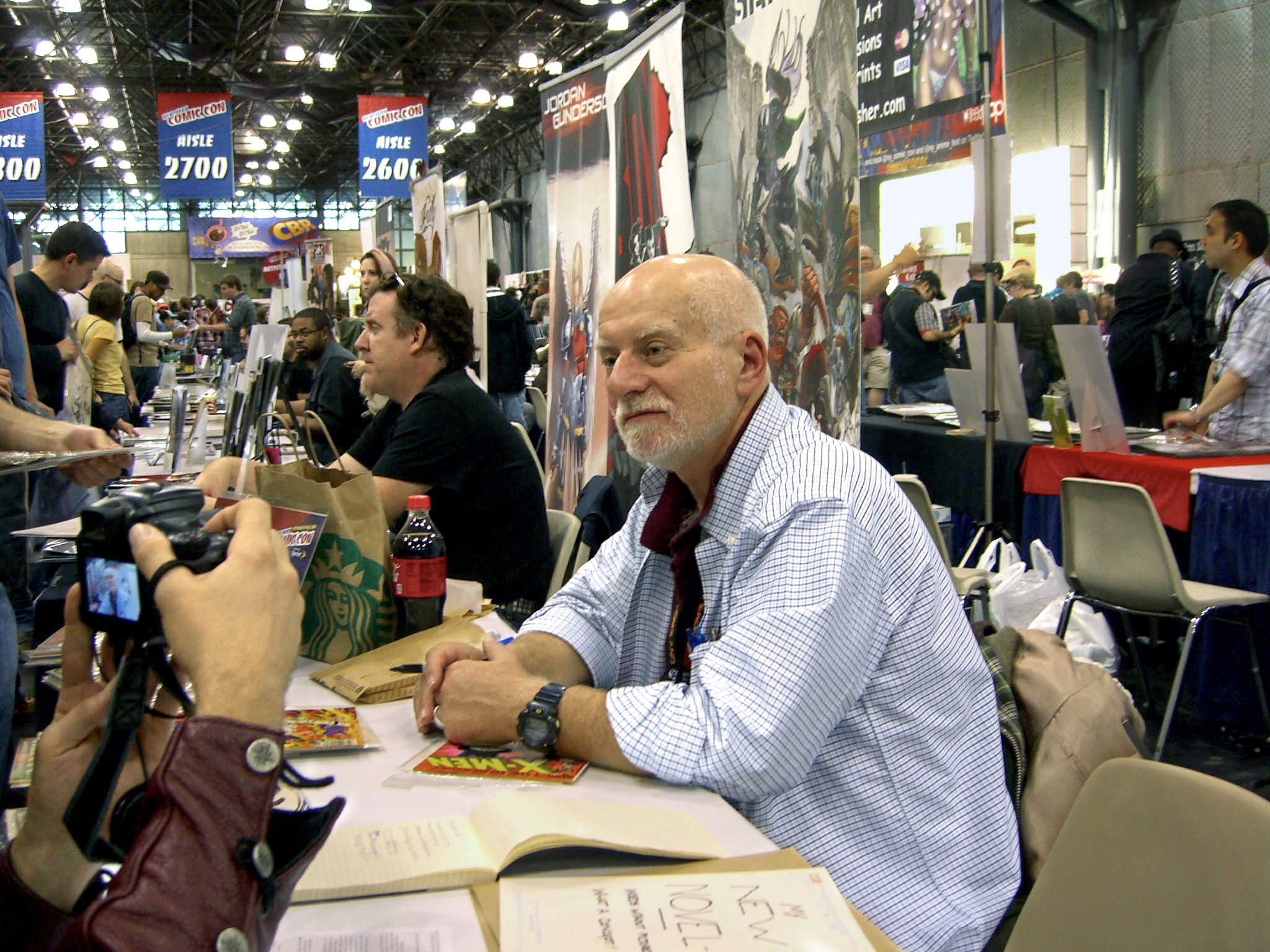
Claremont being interviewed on breaking into the comics industry at the 2011 New York Comic Con

According to writer/editor Paul Levitz, Claremont's complex story structures "played a pivotal role in assembling the audience that enabled American comics to move to more mature and sophisticated storytelling, and the graphic novel." Claremont's editor on the series, Louise Simonson, attributes the X-Men's success to his approach to the characters: "Chris took them very seriously. They were real people to him."

As the writer of X-Men, Claremont became known for certain characteristic phrases, such as Wolverine's saying, "I'm the best there is at what I do. And what I do...isn't very nice", which became closely associated with the character.

In a 2009 Slate article, Grady Hendrix called Claremont the "soapiest writer in comic books.... The classic Claremont pose is either a character, head hung in shame with two enormous rivers of tears running down the cheeks as he or she delivers a self-loathing monologue, or a character with head thrown back and mouth open in a shout of rage, shaking tiny fists at heaven and vowing that the whole world will soon learn about his or her feelings." Hendrix goes on to state "The genius of Chris Claremont was that he made mutants a generic stand-in for all minorities". "I'm an immigrant," said Claremont in 2014, describing his affinity with outsiders. After arriving in the United States from England, he was beaten up "because I looked like a geek." His emphasis on the theme of prejudice resonated with readers as the X-Men series rose in popularity.

=== Novels and acting ===
In 1987 Claremont began writing genre novels. His first was a science fiction trilogy about female USAF pilot/astronaut Nicole Shea, consisting of First Flight (1987), Grounded! (1991), and Sundowner (1994). Claremont co-wrote the Chronicles of the Shadow War trilogy, Shadow Moon (1995), Shadow Dawn (1996), and Shadow Star (1999), with George Lucas, which continued the story of Elora Danan from the movie Willow. Claremont was a contributor to the Wild Cards anthology series.

Claremont made a cameo appearance in the opening scene of the 2006 film X-Men: The Last Stand, for which he is credited as "Lawnmower man". He made a cameo appearance as a Congressional committee member alongside fellow comic book writer Len Wein in an early scene in the 2014 film X-Men: Days of Future Past. Claremont has an uncredited cameo as the handyman/sword restorer in Heroes Season 1, episode 22.

=== Charity work ===
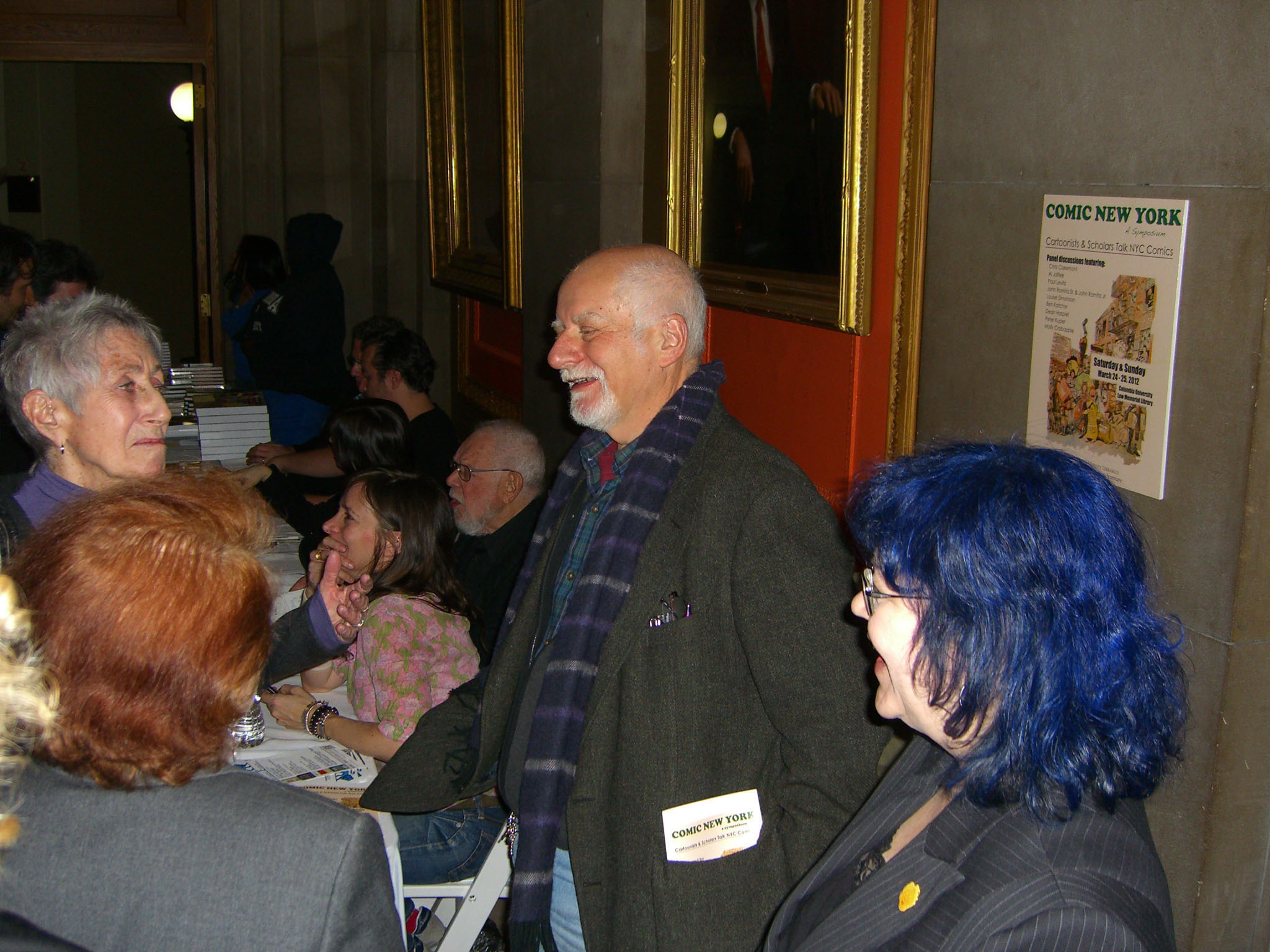
Claremont at the Comic New York symposium at Columbia University on March 24, 2012

In December 2010 Claremont appeared at a book signing at Borders at Penn Plaza in Manhattan as part of a series of events nationwide to commemorate World AIDS Day, with 25% of the proceeds of books sold at the event donated to Lifebeat, a nonprofit organization that educates young people on HIV/AIDS prevention.

In July 2011 Claremont signed a deed of gift to Columbia University's Rare Book & Manuscript Library, donating his archives of all his major writing projects over the previous 40 years to the Library's nascent comics archives collection, forming the foundation of a research collection focusing on New York City-based cartoonists and comics writers. Following the examination and processing of the materials, which include notebooks, correspondence, early story drafts, plays, novels, comic books and materials from Claremont's early training in the theater and his career as an actor, Claremont's archive will be housed at the Rare Book & Manuscript Library in Butler Library, separate from the graphic novels collection, and will be open to anyone who demonstrates a need for its use, with a Finding Aid being made available online. Claremont's longtime editor Louise Simonson said, "his papers will provide many clues, not only to the evolving way comic books are created and presented, but also how they are perceived, licensed, bought and sold in America and around the world."

== Personal life ==
In the mid-1970s, Claremont was married to Bonnie Wilford. Following the dissolution of that marriage, he married Beth Fleisher, with whom Claremont co-authored Dragon Moon. Fleisher is the cousin (through marriage) of editor Dan Raspler, who was the editor on JLA during the six-issue "Tenth Circle" story arc Claremont and John Byrne wrote in 2004. Claremont and Fleisher have twin sons.

== Awards ==
- 1980 Inkpot Award
- 1992 Comics Buyer's Guide Fan Award for Favorite Graphic Novel or Album for Star Trek: Debt of Honor
- 1979 Eagle Award for Best Comicbook Writer (US)
- 1979 Eagle Award for Favourite Single Story – X-Men #111 – "Mindgames" with John Byrne
- 1979 Eagle Award for Favourite Comicbook – X-Men
- 1979 Eagle Award for Favourite Group or Team – X-Men
- 1980 Eagle Award for Favourite Comicbook Writer
- 1980 Eagle Award for Favourite Continued Comic Story – X-Men #125–128 with John Byrne
- 1980 Eagle Award for Favourite Comicbook – X-Men
- 1980 Eagle Award for Favourite Team – X-Men
- 1984 Eagle Award for Favourite Group or Team (US) – X-Men
- 1986 Eagle Award for Favourite Group or Team (US) – X-Men
- Charles Flint Kellogg Award in Arts and Letters from Bard College

== See also ==
- Comics in Focus: Chris Claremont's X-Men

Preceded by Steve Gerber	Daredevil writer 1975	Succeeded by Tony Isabella
Preceded by Len Wein	Uncanny X-Men writer 1975–1991	Succeeded by John Byrne
Preceded by n/a	Captain Britain writer 1976	Succeeded by Gary Friedrich
Preceded by Michael Fleisher	Man-Thing writer 1980–1981 (with fill-ins by Dickie Mackenzie and J. M. DeMatteis)	Succeeded by J. M. DeMatteis
Preceded by n/a	New Mutants writer 1983–1987	Succeeded by Louise Simonson
Preceded by n/a	Excalibur writer 1987–1991	Succeeded by Scott Lobdell
Preceded by n/a	Wolverine writer 1988–1989	Succeeded by Peter David
Preceded by Louise Simonson	X-Factor writer 1991	Succeeded by Peter David
Preceded by n/a	X-Men vol. 2 writer 1991	Succeeded by John Byrne
Preceded by Warren Ellis	Wolverine writer 1998	Succeeded by Todd Dezago
Preceded by Scott Lobdell	Fantastic Four writer 1998–2000	Succeeded by John Francis Moore
Preceded by Alan Davis	Uncanny X-Men writer 2000–2001	Succeeded by Scott Lobdell
Preceded by Alan Davis	X-Men vol. 2 writer 2000–2001	Succeeded by Scott Lobdell
Preceded by Chuck Austen	Uncanny X-Men writer 2004–2006	Succeeded by Ed Brubaker
