= De Sagazan =

De Sagazan is a surname. Notable people with the surname include:

- Anglèse de Sagazan (died 1582), French shepherdess
- Olivier de Sagazan (born 1959), French artist
- Zaho de Sagazan (born 1999), French singer-songwriter and musician
