= Anglèse de Sagazan =

Anglèse de Sagazan (died 1582) was a French shepherdess from Lannemezan who claimed she saw three Marian apparitions in Monléon (70 kilometers away from Lourdes) three times in 1515.

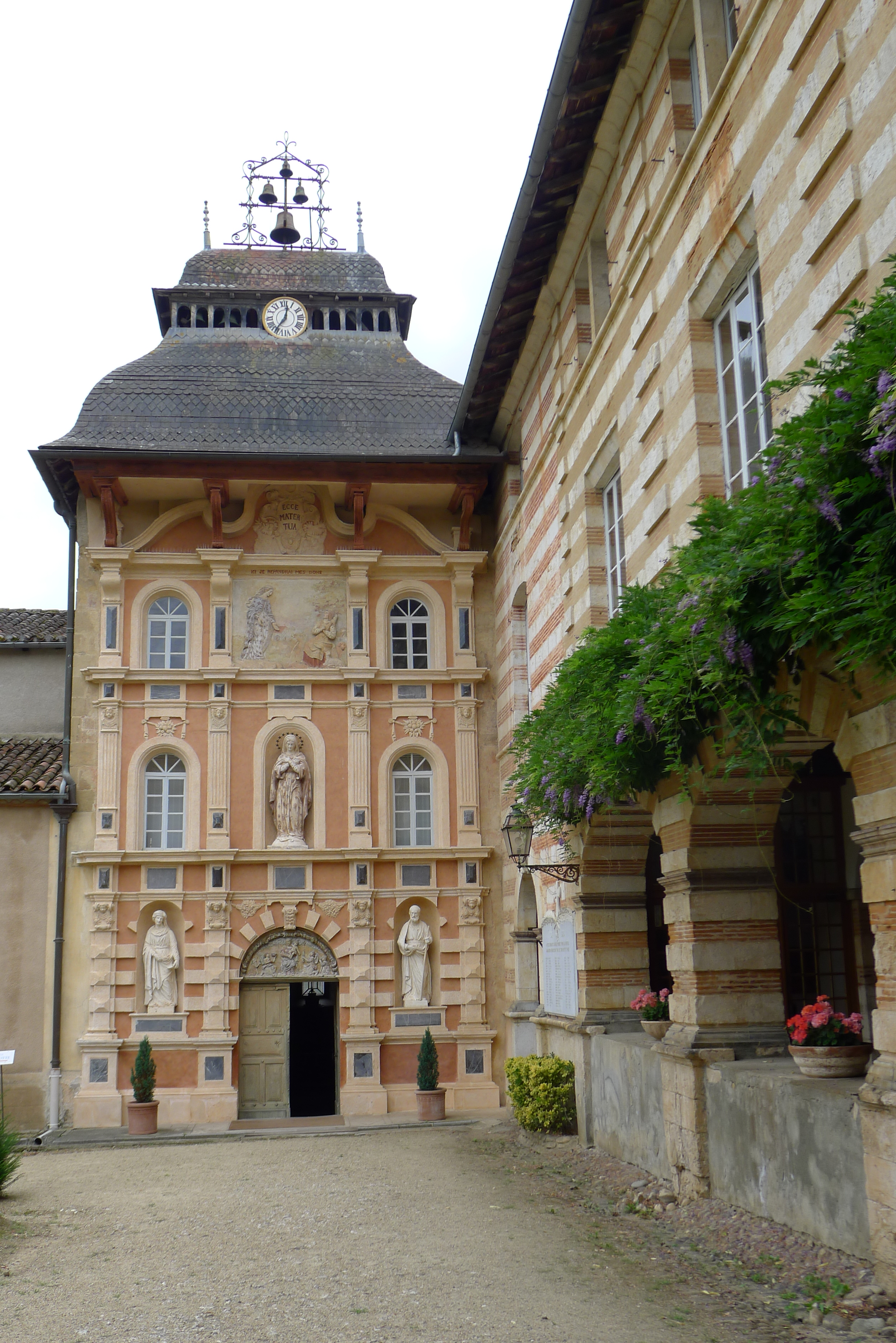
Notre-Dame-de-Garaison.

== Life ==
The first apparition occurred near a fountain while she was looking after a herd of sheep in Monleón. The Virgin Mary asked Anglèse to tell her father she wanted the local consuls to build a church next to the fountain. While her father told the consuls, the request was rejected. Shortly after, Anglèse talked to the Virgin Mary again, who asked her to tell her father a second time. This time, the local priest left a Christian cross near the fountain. Meanwhile, Anglèse, who had left a loaf of grey bread with the Virgin Mary during the first apparition, found it in her house, although it had become a loaf of white bread.

By 1540, a church was built where the cross lay. Believers claimed miracles occurred and the sick were healed when they visited the church.

Anglèse subsequently became a Catholic nun at the Benardine monastery in Fabas, Haute-Garonne.

== Death and legacy ==
Anglèse died on December 30, 1582. Seven years later, in 1589, Protestants ransacked the church.

In 1604, an annual pilgrimage to the church was established. Meanwhile, theologian Étienne de Molinier wrote about Anglèse's story in Le Lys du Val de Garaison in 1630. The church, Notre-Dame-de-Garaison, is still active; there is also a Catholic school next door.

American historian Ruth Harris writes extensively about Anglèse and her visitations, placing them in historical and cultural context and comparing them with those of St. Bernadette Soubirous in Lourdes in 1858.
