= Baraka (film) =

1992 documentary directed by Ron Fricke

- Theatrical release poster
- Directed by: Ron Fricke
- Written by: Constantine Nicholas; Genevieve Nicholas
- Produced by: Mark Magidson
- Cinematography: Ron Fricke
- Edited by: Ron Fricke; Mark Magidson; David Aubrey
- Music by: Michael Stearns
- Production company: Magidson Films
- Distributed by: The Samuel Goldwyn Company
- Release date: September 24, 1992
- Running time: 97 minutes
- Country: United States
- Budget: $2 million
- Box office: $1.3 million

Baraka is a 1992 American non-narrative documentary film directed by Ron Fricke. It was photographed in the 65 mm Todd-AO format, and is the first film ever to be restored and scanned at 8K resolution.

== Content ==
Baraka is a documentary film with no narrative or voice-over. It explores themes via a compilation of natural events, life, human activities and technological phenomena shot in 24 countries on six continents over a 14-month period.

The film is named after the Islamic concept of baraka (بَرَكَة), meaning blessing.

The film is Ron Fricke's follow-up to Godfrey Reggio's similar non-verbal documentary film Koyaanisqatsi. Fricke was a cinematographer and collaborator on Reggio's film, and for Baraka he struck out on his own to polish and expand the photographic techniques used on Koyaanisqatsi. Shot in 65 mm, it includes a mixture of photographic styles including slow motion and time-lapse. Two camera systems were used to achieve this. A Todd-AO system was used to shoot conventional frame rates, but to execute the film's time-lapse sequences Fricke camera built a special camera that combined time-lapse photography with perfectly controlled movements.

Locations featured include the Church of the Holy Sepulchre in Jerusalem, the Ryōan temple in Kyoto, Lake Natron in Tanzania, burning oil fields in Kuwait, the smouldering precipice of an active volcano, a busy subway terminal, the aircraft boneyard of Davis–Monthan Air Force Base, tribal celebrations of the Maasai in Kenya, and chanting monks in the Dip Tse Chok Ling monastery.

The film features a number of long tracking shots through various settings, including Auschwitz and Tuol Sleng, over photos of the people involved, past skulls stacked in a room, to a spread of bones. It suggests a universal cultural perspective: a shot of an elaborate tattoo on a bathing Japanese yakuza precedes a view of tribal paint.

== Reissue ==
Following previous DVD releases, in 2007 the original 65 mm negative was rescanned at 8K resolution with equipment designed specifically for Baraka at FotoKem Laboratories. The automated 8K film scanner, operating continuously, took more than three weeks to finish scanning more than 150,000 frames (taking approximately twelve to thirteen seconds to scan each frame), producing over thirty terabytes of image data in total.

After a 16-month digital intermediate process, including a 96 kHz/24-bit audio remaster by Stearns for the DTS-HD Master Audio soundtrack, the result was re-released on DVD and Blu-ray in October 2008. At the time, project supervisor Andrew Oran described the reissue of Baraka as "arguably the highest-quality DVD that's ever been made". Chicago Sun-Times critic Roger Ebert described the Blu-ray release as "the finest video disc I have ever viewed or ever imagined."

== Reception ==
Baraka holds a score of 85% on Rotten Tomatoes out of twenty-six reviews. Roger Ebert included the film in his "Great Movies" list, writing: "If man sends another Voyager to the distant stars and it can carry only one film on board, that film might be Baraka."

== Production ==
=== Music ===
The score is by Michael Stearns and features music by, among others, Dead Can Dance, L. Subramaniam, Ciro Hurtado, Inkuyo, Brother, Anugama & Sebastiano and David Hykes.

In 2019, German composer Mathias Rehfeldt released the concept album Baraka, inspired by the film.

=== Filming ===
The project was shot in 152 locations in 24 countries.

==== Africa ====
- Egypt: Cairo; City of the Dead; Giza pyramid complex; Karnak temple, Luxor; Ramesseum
- Kenya: Lake Magadi; Mara Kichwan Tembo Manyatta; Mara Rianta Manyatta; Maasai Mara
- Tanzania: Lake Natron

==== United States ====
- Arizona: American Express, Phoenix; Canyon de Chelly National Monument, Chinle; Davis–Monthan Air Force Base, Tucson; Peabody coal mine, Black Mesa; Phoenix
- California: Big Sur; Los Angeles; Santa Cruz (chicken farm scenes)
- Colorado: Mesa Verde National Park
- Hawaii: Haleakalā National Park, Maui; Kona; Puʻu ʻŌʻō, Hawaiʻi Volcanoes National Park
- New York: Empire State Building, Manhattan, New York City; Grand Central Terminal, Manhattan, New York City; Helmsley Building, Manhattan, New York City; McGraw-Hill Building, Manhattan, New York City; World Trade Center, Manhattan, New York City; Green Haven Correctional Facility, Beekman, New York; Stormville, New York
- Utah: Arches National Park, Moab; Canyonlands National Park, Moab
- Others: Shiprock, New Mexico; White House, Washington, D.C.

==== South America ====
- Argentina: Iguazu Falls, Misiones
- Brazil: Carajás Animal Reserve, Pará; Iguazu Falls, Paraná; Ipanema, Favela da Rocinha, Rio de Janeiro; Caiapó Village, Pará; Porto Velho, Rondônia; Represa Samuel, Rondônia; Rio Preto, Minas Gerais; São Paulo City, São Paulo state
- Ecuador: Barrio Mapasingue, Guayaquil; Cementerio Ciudad Blanca; Galápagos Islands; Guayaquil

==== Asia ====
- Cambodia: Angkor Thom; Angkor Wat; Angkor; Bayon; Phnom Penh; Preah Khan; Siem Reap; Ta Prohm; Tonle Omm Gate; Tuol Sleng Museum; Sonsam Kosal Killing Fields
- China: Beijing; Great Hall of the People; Tiananmen Square; Guilin; Li River, Qin Shi Huang; Xi'an
- Hong Kong: Kowloon Walled City, Kowloon
- India: Calcutta, West Bengal; Chennai, Tamil Nadu; Ganges River; Ghats; Kailashnath Temple, Varanasi; National Museum of India, New Delhi; Varadharaja Temple, Varanasi
- Indonesia: Borobudur; Java; Candi Nandi; Candi Prambanan; Gudang Garam cigarette factory; Kasunanan Palace; Surakarta; Istiqlal Mosque, Jakarta; Kediri; Tabanan; Bali; Mancan Padi; Mount Bromo Valley; Tampak Siring; Tegallalang; Gunung Kawi temple; Uluwatu
- Iran: Imam Mosque; Imam Reza Shrine, Mashhad; Isfahan; Persepolis; Shah Chiragh; Shiraz
- Japan: Green Plaza Capsule Hotel; Hokke-Ji temple; JVC Yokosuka Factory; Kyoto; Meiji Shrine; Nagano Springs; Nara; Nittaku; Ryōan-ji temple; Sangho-ji Temple; Shinjuku Station; Tokyo; the Hachikō Exit, Shibuya Station; Tomoe Shizung & Hakutobo; Yamanouchi, Nagano; Zōjō-ji temple
- Israel: Church of the Holy Sepulchre; Western Wall
- Kuwait: Ahmadi; Burgan Field; Jahra Road, Mitla Ridge (Farouk Abdul-Aziz researched and produced this segment)
- Nepal: Bhaktapur; Boudhanath; Durbar Square, Kathmandu; Hanuman Ghat; Himalayas; Mount Everest; Mount Thamserku; Pasupati; Swayambhu
- Saudi Arabia: Mecca
- Thailand: Ayutthaya Province; Bang Pa-In; Bangkok; NMB Factory; Patpong; Soi Cowboy; Wat Arun; Wat Suthat

==== Oceania ====
- Australia: Bathurst Island; Cocinda; Jim Jim Falls; Kakadu National Park; Kunwarde Hwarde Valley; Uluru

==== Europe ====
- Poland: Oświęcim (German Auschwitz concentration camp); Sztutowo (German Stutthof concentration camp); Bytom
- France: Chartres Cathedral; Notre-Dame de Reims
- Vatican City: St. Peter's Basilica
- Turkey: Galata Mevlevi Lodge Museum; Hagia Sophia

== Sequel ==
A sequel to Baraka, Samsara, also shot in 65 mm and made by the same filmmakers, premiered at the 2011 Toronto International Film Festival and was released internationally in August 2012.

== See also ==
- Abstract animation
- Chronos
- Home
- Cinéma pur
- Cinéma vérité
