= Farouk Abdul-Aziz =

Egyptian director, film critic, and TV personality

Farouk Abdul-Aziz Mahmoud Abdullah
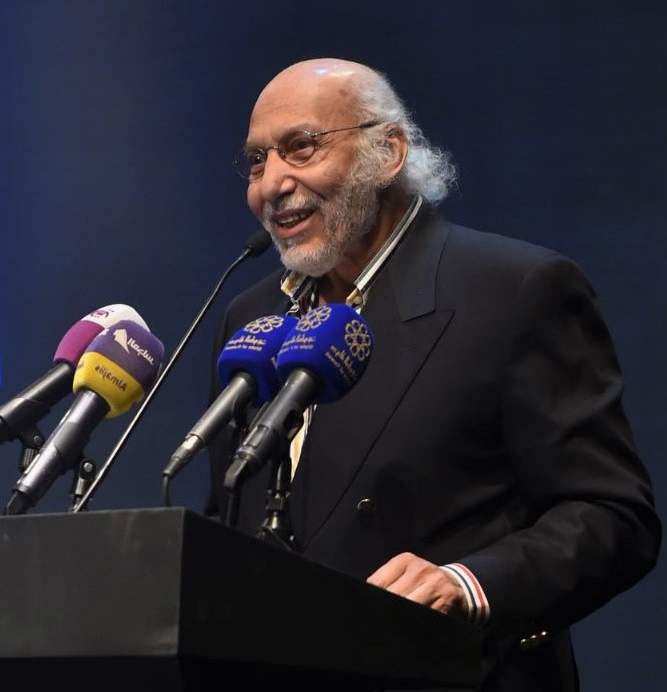
- Born: July 24, 1946; Al Mahallah Al Kubra, Gharbiah Governorate, Egypt
- Citizenship: Egypt
- Education: Cairo University, BA English Language & Literature, Faculty of Literature, 1968, Egypt
- Occupations: Film director, film producer, interviewer, TV presenter, screenwriter
- Spouse: Nadia Lutfy Dawwi (since 1988)
- Children: 2
- Website: www.farouqoncinema.com

Farouq Abdul-Aziz (born July 24, 1946, at El-Mahalla El-Kubra, in the heartland of Egypt's Nile Delta) is a TV presenter, interviewer, writer, producer and director. He belongs to the second generation of Egyptian film critics, with a style deeply rooted in 20th-century literary criticism.

== Biography ==
Farouk Abdul-Aziz's career began in 1966 as a film and art critic on Egyptian radio. Before obtaining his Bachelor's of Arts in English literature from the Faculty of Arts at Cairo University, he was involved in writing comic strips for Disney's Middle East Arabic language franchise, the Mickey Mouse Weekly, where he published his noted one-year-long series The Gates of Cairo (1967–1968).

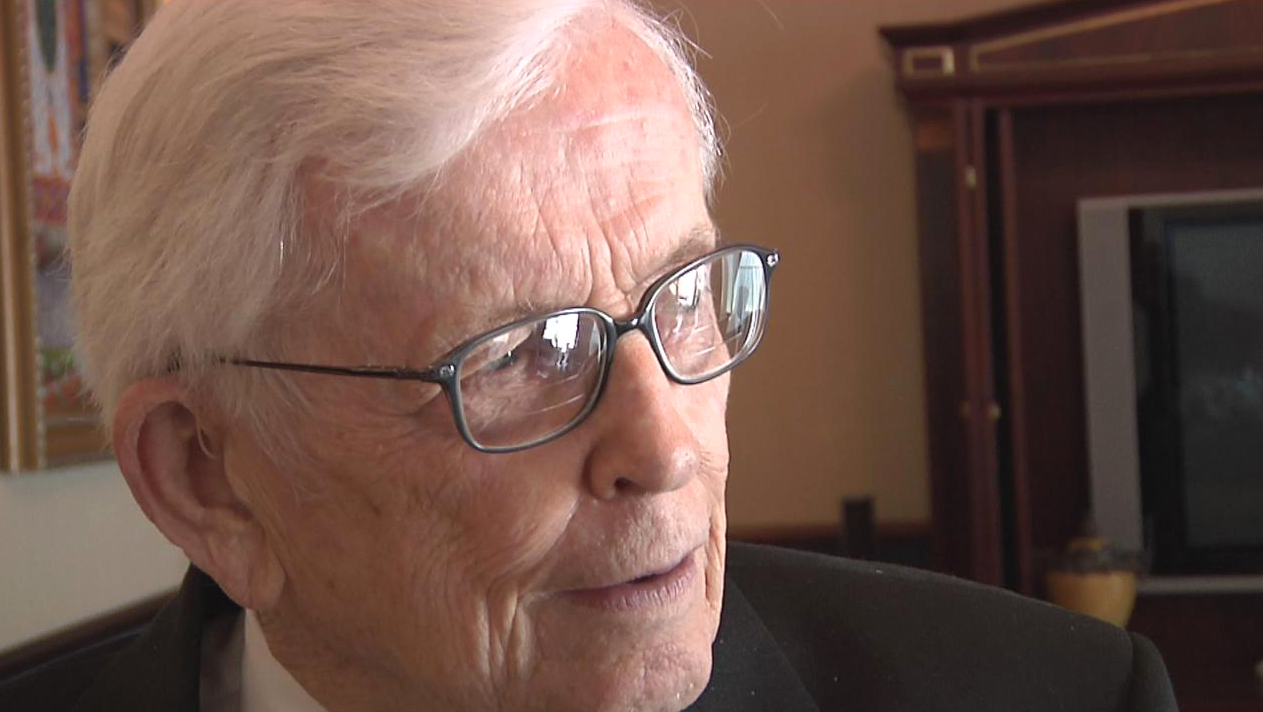
Ex-Congressman Paul Findley being interviewed in March 2012

Fresh from college in 1968, Farouk worked at Cairo's monthly Al Majallah ('The Magazine') to publish his Arabic translation of Paul Klee's lecture on Modern Art in book form. From 1968 to 1977, Farouk worked freelance, covering arts activities for the Cairo evening newspaper, the daily Al Messa ('The Evening'). It was during this period that his second translation of Klee's work, Pedagogical Sketchbook was serialized. In 1969, Al Majallah also published Farouk's translation of three articles authored by Henry Moore, a rare contribution by the English landmark sculptor. In 1974, Farouk hosted English sculptor and painter Hubert Dalwood on an Egyptian Radio show, as well as for live appearances at Cairo and Alexandria's Faculty of Fine Arts.

=== Early career (1968 – 1976) ===
Farouq focused on the school of Objective Criticism, the rules of which were laid down by poet and critic T. S. Eliot in the 1920s. From 1968 until 1974, Farouq, a committed art critic, traversed various art disciplines and published his criticism in the Egyptian written press, radio, and television. In 1974, Farouq shifted his focus to film criticism.

=== Late 1970s and move to Kuwait ===
In 1976, Farouq made a permanent move to Kuwait. During this time, he worked continuously and was featured in nearly every newspaper in the country, including Al-Seyassah, Al-Watan, Al-Qabas, Arab Times, and Kuwait Times. From 1978 to 1980, Farouq spent the better part of two years co-writing and producing the British documentary Vanessa Talks with Farouk Abdulaziz on the life and times of actress and outspoken activist Vanessa Redgrave.

=== 1980s ===
In the 1980s, Farouk created a documentary produced in both English and Arabic about the making of Lion of The Desert, the Hollywood blockbuster starring Anthony Quinn as Libyan resistance leader Omar al-Mukhtar. Farouq also produced the Arabic version of "The Great National Parks of Europe," a 10-hour series produced by Telepol Suisse.

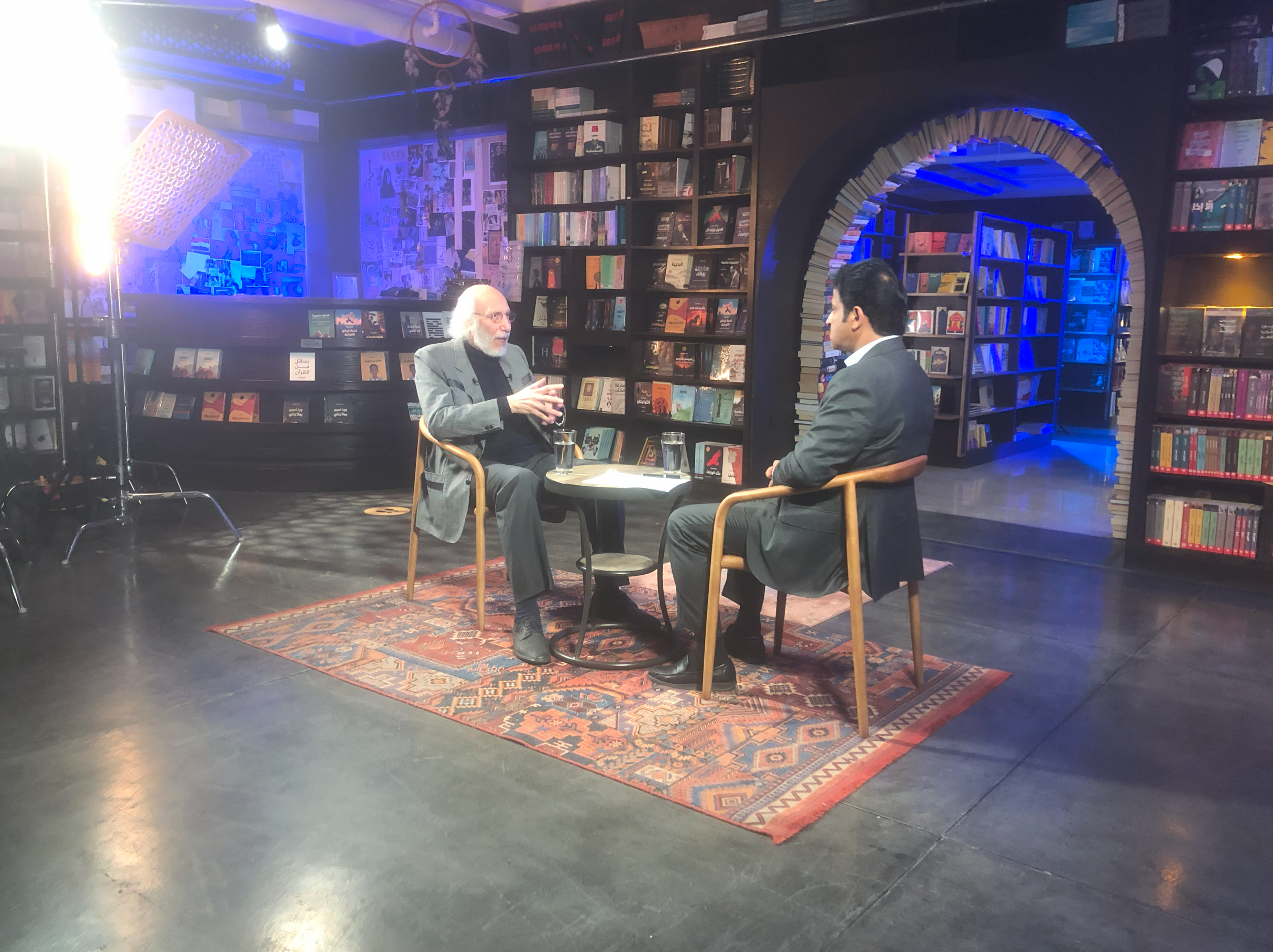
Al Jazeera TV Network's 2 episode interview recorded on Nov. 30. 2023

Between 1986 and 1987, Farouq expanded his activities to include co-writing and co-producing the International English-speaking version of the 18-hour Japanese documentary series The Silk Road - Part Two. The series, produced by NHK Television, was later broadcast on almost all major international television networks.

Following the 1988 telecast of the Turkish language version of The Silk Road, the Turkish Ministry of Culture invited Farouq to produce a documentary about Turkey. The film, titled "Merhaba" (Welcome), was told from an Arab perspective and primarily intended for an Arab audience. "Merhaba" aired on various Arab television networks throughout 1988 and 1989.

=== 1990s ===
In the aftermath of the liberation of Kuwait from the Iraqi invasion in February 1991, Farouq produced documentaries chronicling life in Kuwait for several international television networks, including NBC in the US and the BBC in the UK. He also produced the Kuwait segment for the critically acclaimed film Baraka (1992).

In the three years that followed, Farouq served as a development producer on a documentary series project for international broadcasters, including CBC in Canada. He also branched out and acted as a media consultant on a number of projects, including the creation of international production companies and specialized television channels.

From 1997 through 2000, Farouq focused his energy on writing and developing three children's films for the International Cartoon and Animation Center (ICAC) based in Los Angeles, California. He also served as an artistic consultant for the center during this time.

Farouq continued to conduct film screenings, lectures, and workshops, while also producing documentaries for offices affiliated with the Kuwaiti Amiri Diwan, namely, The Martyr's Bureau, the Secretary of Social Welfare and Development, and The Social Development Office. These efforts focused on addressing the human toll of the Iraqi invasion.

=== 2000s ===
From 2004 until 2018, Farouq acted as a media consultant to several government agencies in the State of Kuwait. In 2008, he began studying the relationship between science and religion, focusing particularly on the scientific and historical references in the Qur’an. This study resulted in the production of approximately 500 short-form films and a few one-hour documentaries all of which were broadcast on Farouq's YouTube channel over a span of 15 years.

The channel is currently active and features an uninterrupted stream of short films, lectures, and archival material. Over the span of 10 years, the channel has garnered over 180,000 subscribers and 20 million views. Farouq's diverse activities across various platforms have attracted considerable pan-Arab attention.

=== 2010s ===
From 2010 until 2012, Farouq spearheaded, produced, and directed a feature-length documentary on Paul Findley, the former US congressman, and his relationship with the Palestinian issue. The film, Honorable Paul: He Who Dared to Speak Out, is currently in post-production.

Farouq published five books between 2016 and 2018. These books, released in both English and Arabic, further scrutinized the relationship between science and the Qur’an. The titles include: Maurice and The Qur’an, Knitted by the Stars, and Who, 14 Centuries ago, Could’ve Known That?

For two years, starting in 2017, Farouq produced six documentaries chronicling his experience during the seven months of the Iraqi occupation of Kuwait, as well as the liberation that followed.

In 2019, Farouq completed the final draft of a script based on Alan Villiers’s book Sons of Sinbad (1940). The international docudrama project is intended to document the final chapters of Kuwaiti sailing navigation.

=== 2020s ===
From 2020 to 2021, Farouq wrote, directed, and produced a series for Arab television networks titled Al-Burhan (Evidence). The show investigates a selection of scientific, historical, and rhetorical references in the Qur’an, framing its exploration within the study of the relationship between science and religion.

In July 2023, Farouq began writing a new documentary series entitled Life Before Life. The series, scheduled for production and release in five languages in 2024, depicts the close affinity of contemporary Embryology with Qur’anic verses that accurately describe the stages of human reproduction.

Farouq Abdul-Aziz has been a ubiquitous presence in the landscape of Arab media, frequently appearing in print media and as a guest on various television and radio programs, where he recalls stories from his 55-year career span.

== Children’s writer, then and now ==
Farouq Abdul-Aziz's 55-year career has been characterized by a rare kind of diversity. Before graduating from Cairo University in 1968, where he studied English language and literature, Farouq wrote comics for Mickey, an Arabic language version of Disney's popular comic strip. His series The Gates of Cairo continued for a whole year. The experience of writing comics paid off 30 years later when the US-based International Cartoon and Animation Center (ICAC) commissioned him to write three feature-length children's films. He also produced the Arabic language version of The Knights of Virtue for the center. The first of his three features, titled The Return of The Golden Queen, was released in 2000 in both English and Arabic.

== Formative arts critic ==
In 1967, Farouq translated Paul Klee’s seminal book, On Modern Art. Farouq’s version was published in 1968, the year he graduated from university. The translation was published in Al-Magalla (The Magazine), one of the most important and culturally relevant Arab magazines of all time. Farouq’s translation was immediately embraced in the art world and subsequently landed him a steady assignment as an art critic for Al-Massa’ (The Evening), a Cairo-based newspaper. The job lasted from 1968 through 1977.

Al-Massa’, the only evening newspaper at that time, published Farouq's translation of another Paul Klee book titled: Pedagogical Sketchbooks on its formative arts page. In 1969, Al-Magalla published another of Farouq's translations, this time it was of three articles by the prominent English sculptor Henry Moore. In 1974, another prominent sculptor, Hubert Dalwood was a guest on Farouq's radio program Horizons of Art, which aired on Channel 2 of Cairo Radio. In 1987, Farouq returned to the formative arts with his translation of Salvador Dalí's Dalí on Modern Art: The Cuckolds of Antiquated Modern Art; these translations were published serially in Al-Qabas (The Torch), a Kuwaiti newspaper. In 2005, Farouq published a comprehensive study on the Egyptian painter Mahmoud Abdul Aa’ti in Al-Funoon (The Arts), a Kuwaiti monthly magazine. In 2009, Al-Funoon published another of Farouq’s studies, this time on The Prospects of Islamic Art Today.

== Radio beginnings ==
Farouq’s relationship with the Program 2 began at Cairo Radio the year before graduation, during which he translated into Arabic a number of short stories by William Saroyan, Katherine Mansfield and Henry James. In 1974 he was appointed presenter at Program 2. He wrote a dramatic program about the American novelist F Scott Fitzgerald. In it, he played the role of the writer himself, and then later published the teleplay in the Syrian magazine Al-Mawqif Al-Adabi (The Literary Report) in February of 1976.

== Film criticism, the choice of a lifetime ==
Farouq’s relationship with film criticism, which then became his main passion, began in 1974 when he started publishing critical articles on some of the world’s national cinemas including Soviet, Hungarian, Cuban, Egyptian, Arab and the American independent. During that period, he participated in editing Brazilian Cinema, a book on the then new Brazilian Cinema Nuovo movement. The book was published by the Egyptian Film Critics Association EFCA, and was selected to accompany a major festival organized by the association for Brazilian Cinema in Cairo in 1975.

Farouq’s critical articles were published on a semi-weekly basis starting in 1974 in the Bulletin of the Cairo Cinema Club and in the daily newspaper Al-Massa’ (The Evening), and on a semi-monthly basis in the literature and arts supplement of the Egyptian monthly magazine Al-Taleea’ (The Vanguard). A number of Farouq's articles from this period (1974–1977) were published in several Arab newspapers and magazines, including the Iraqi magazines Afaq Arabiya (Arab Horizons) and Al-Aqlam (Pens), the Iraqi daily newspaper Al-Jumhuriya (The Republic), and the Kuwaiti magazine Al-Taleea’ (The Vanguard).

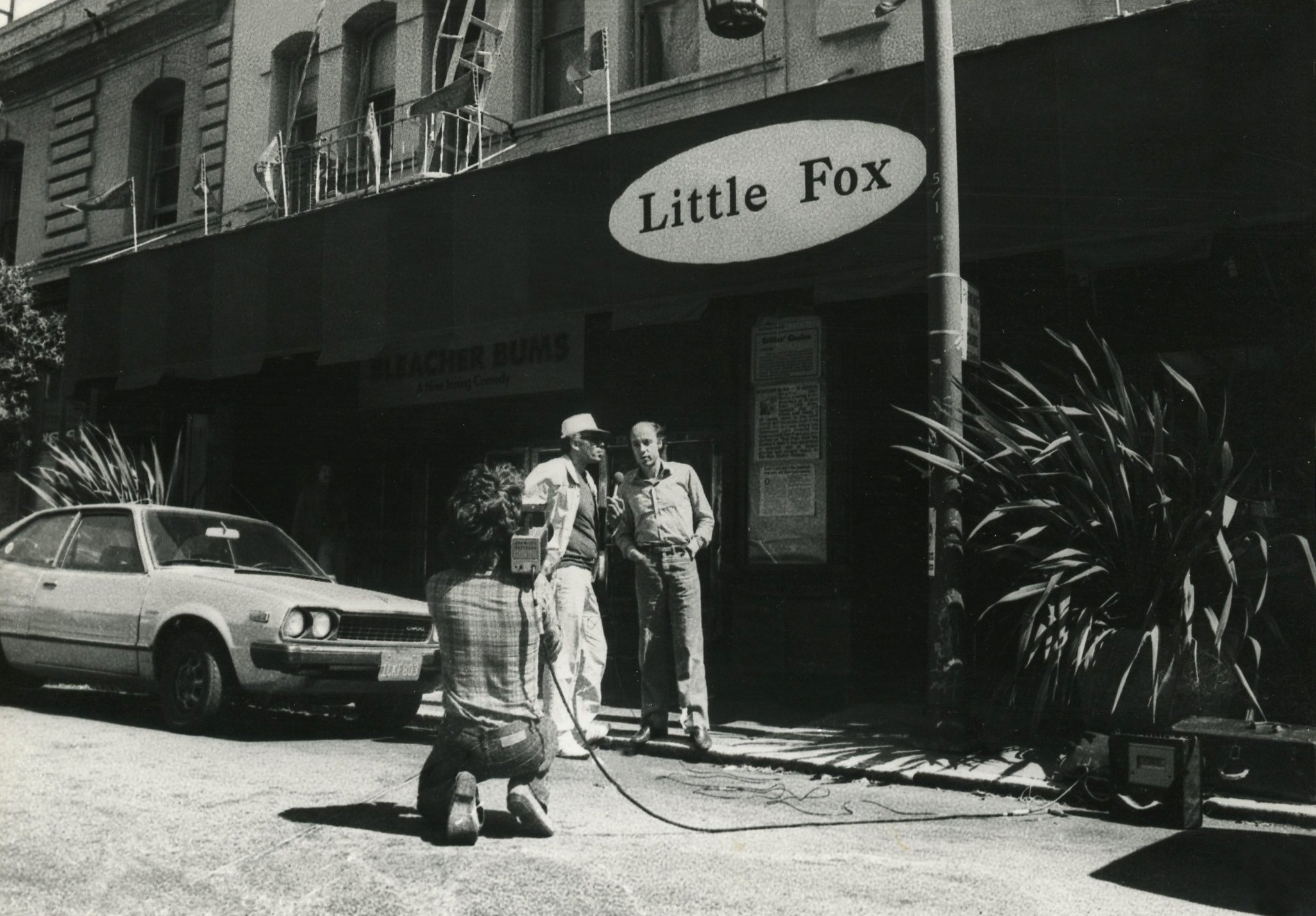
Interviewing Tom Luddy in July 1981

By 1977 Farouq had become a film critic for two Kuwaiti daily publications; Al-Siyasah (Politics) in Arabic and Arab Times in English. The following year, he joined the Kuwaiti daily newspaper Al-Watan (The Homeland) and continued publishing there until 1983. He also joined the Kuwait Times in 1978 and wrote articles there until 1990.

Between 1983 and 1987 Farouq joined the Kuwaiti daily Al-Qabas (The Torch) as a film critic. His contributions to the Kuwaiti pan Arab periodicals Al-Arabi (The Arab) and Al-Funoon (The Arts) monthly magazines continued from 1978 until 2017. Farouq still follows the film criticism path as of the first issue of September 2022 of the quarterly Cinema Al-Youm (Cinema Today) published by the Kuwait Cine-Club.

== Television beginnings ==
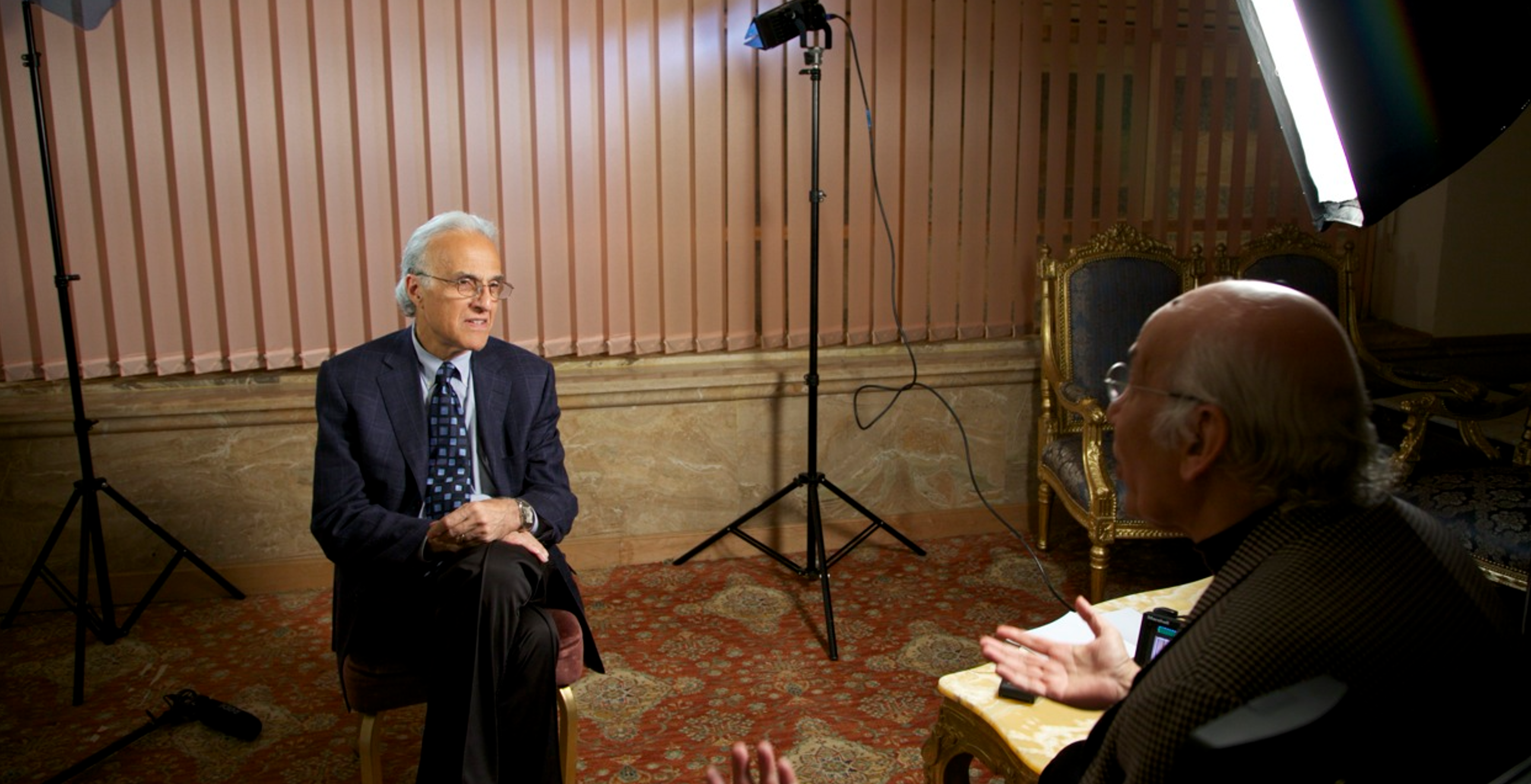
John L Esposito being interviewed by Abdul-Aziz in 2014

Farouq's television career began when he participated in presenting a program titled Film Archives on Cairo Television's Channel Two. This opportunity came through Sobhi Shafieq, the program's creator and film critic in the spring of 1975. Farouq then took over the preparation and presentation of a few episodes, and even hosted solo once. However, the program was then unceremoniously canceled by a ministerial order. It was later revealed that one episode in particular caused the cancellation. Farouq had hosted a live evening broadcast with a delegation from the Cuban Cinema as guests. At the forefront of the delegation was pioneering director Tomas Gutierrez Alea, accompanied by Francisco Detierro, president of the Cuban Film Institute, and cinematographer Hernando Pereira.

The show was interspersed with clips from Alea's classic film, Memories of Underdevelopment and from Fernando Solanas’ seminal film Lucia. Naturally, the filmmakers discussed the role of the Cuban cinema as a force against “American Imperialism”. This discussion greatly annoyed Youssef Al-Sebai, the Minister of Culture. The discussion was too closely related to the political shift in Egypt at the time towards the United States, and so the program was deemed too controversial to deal with on a regular basis, causing the cancellation.

== A McCarthyesque climate ==
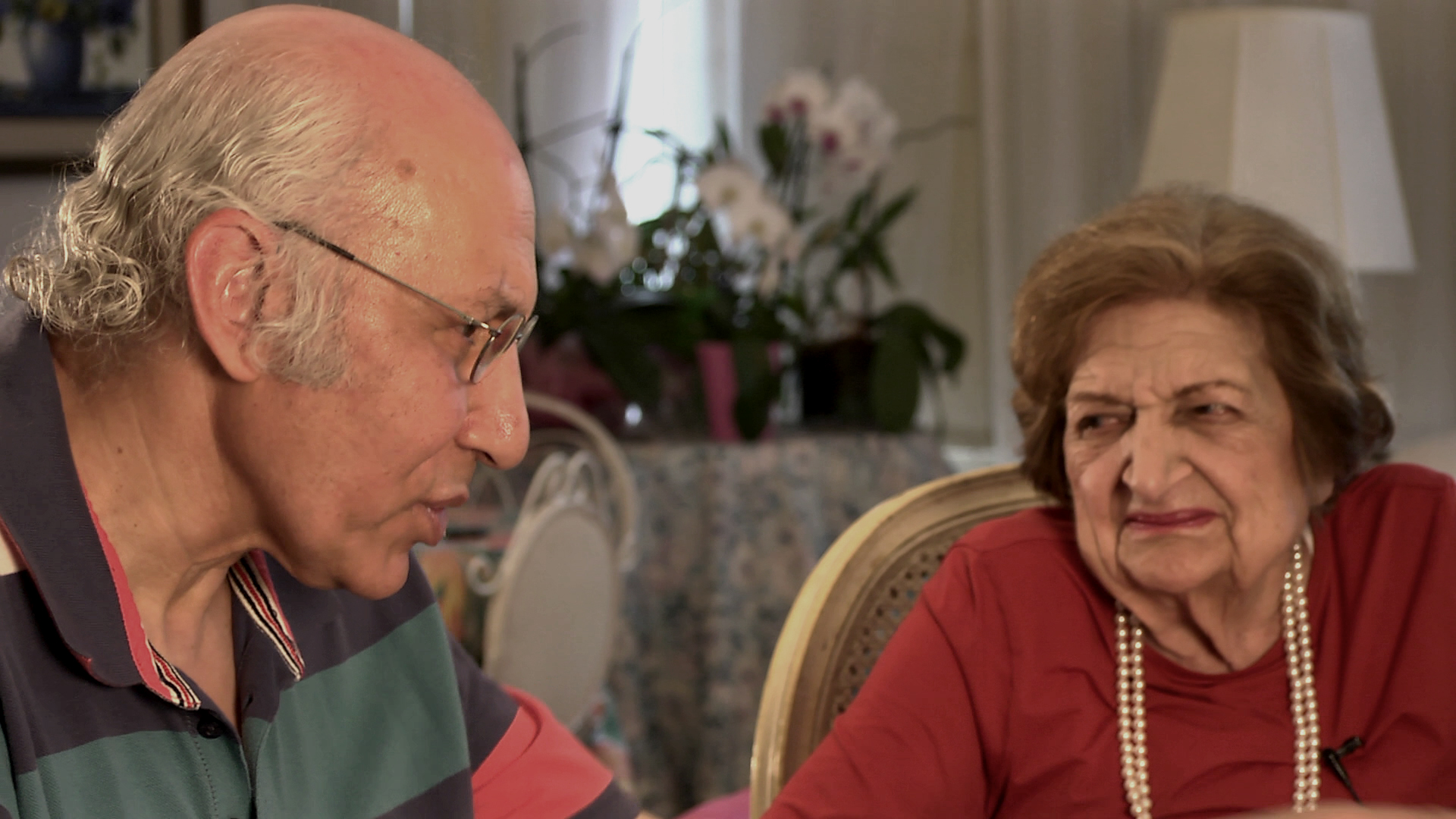
White House AP correspondent Helen Thomas being interviewed

In the mid-seventies, the Egyptian government was quick to end the careers of those they called “Leftist Sympathizers”. They also closed any publications they deemed suspicious. Many of these publications happened to be outlets for Farouq's film criticism. Film Archives was cancelled and radical changes were made in the management at Radio Cairo, which led to Farouq quitting the job. All of these closures and bans happened in quick succession while Farouq was out of the country in Baghdad, participating in the 2nd Baghdad International Film Festival on Palestine in February 1976 where he was a member of the jury of the Union of Arab Film Critics representing the Egyptian Film Critics Association, and covering the event for Al Taleea’ (The Vanguard); the magazine which marked the finale of the closures in August 1976. This suffocating atmosphere caused Farouq to leave Egypt and look for bigger and better opportunities elsewhere.

== Interviews ==
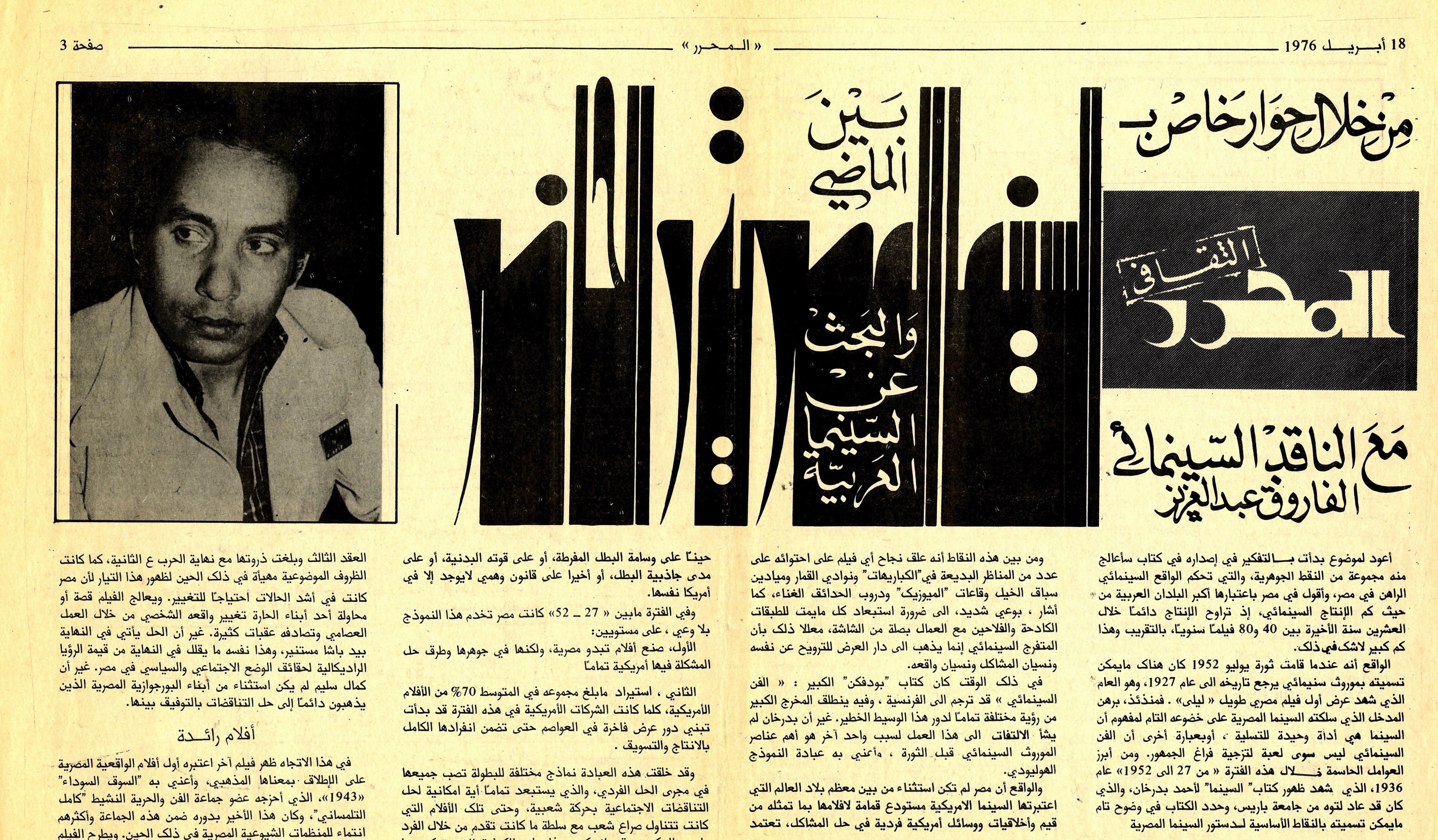
The Moroccan Al Muharrir interview of April 18, 1976

The Moroccan writer Ahmed Al-Madini conducted a lengthy interview with Farouq on the sidelines of the 2nd edition of the Baghdad International Film Festival on Palestine in March 1976, which he published on approximately two pages in the Moroccan daily newspaper Al-Muharrer (The Editor) on April 18 of the same year. That press interview was the beginning of a long series of press, radio, and television interviews that extended from Cairo to Kuwait and Morocco, from Iraq to India, and from Britain and Qatar to the United States.

The American interviews included a press interview published by journalist Hank Werba in Variety, the trade magazine of Hollywood, as part of a file on cinema and television in the Gulf in February 1982. On March 11, 1984, Joan Borsten published an article in the Los Angeles Times entitled: Drilling for Dollars in Movie-Mad Kuwait about Gulf financing in the American film industry. It included an interview with Farouq in which she focused on his role in spreading cinematic culture in the region. In light of Farouq's knowledge of the conditions of television production and cinematic attempts in the area, the British quarterly magazine Arts & the Islamic World commissioned him to write a file on this subject in the spring of 1985. It was soon translated into Arabic and the Kuwaiti Ministry of Information published it in a book format in 1986. As for non-Arabic radio interviews, they include Voice of America radio in Washington, D.C., in July 1981, and in May 1983 and May 1984 on the sidelines of the Cannes International Film Festival, then on l'Orient Radio in October 2009 while working on a documentary in Paris. The BBC Arabic show Hamzat Wasl had also hosted Farouq in London in July 2013 for a conversation about his then in-development project on the Islamic Finance.

A February 2023 interview conducted for the Oral History project by the American University of Kuwait AUK is, to date, the longest and most detailed interview with Farouk Abdul-Aziz. The all-encompassing interview, recorded in multiple sessions over 4 days, covered Farouq's biography and career in great detail. It was published to the Oral History project's website. Shortly thereafter came another interview conducted by Al Jazeera Television Network's team on November 30, 2023, for Al-Muqabala (The Interview), a show that delved into Farouq's life and times as well as experiences and lessons gained through the years.

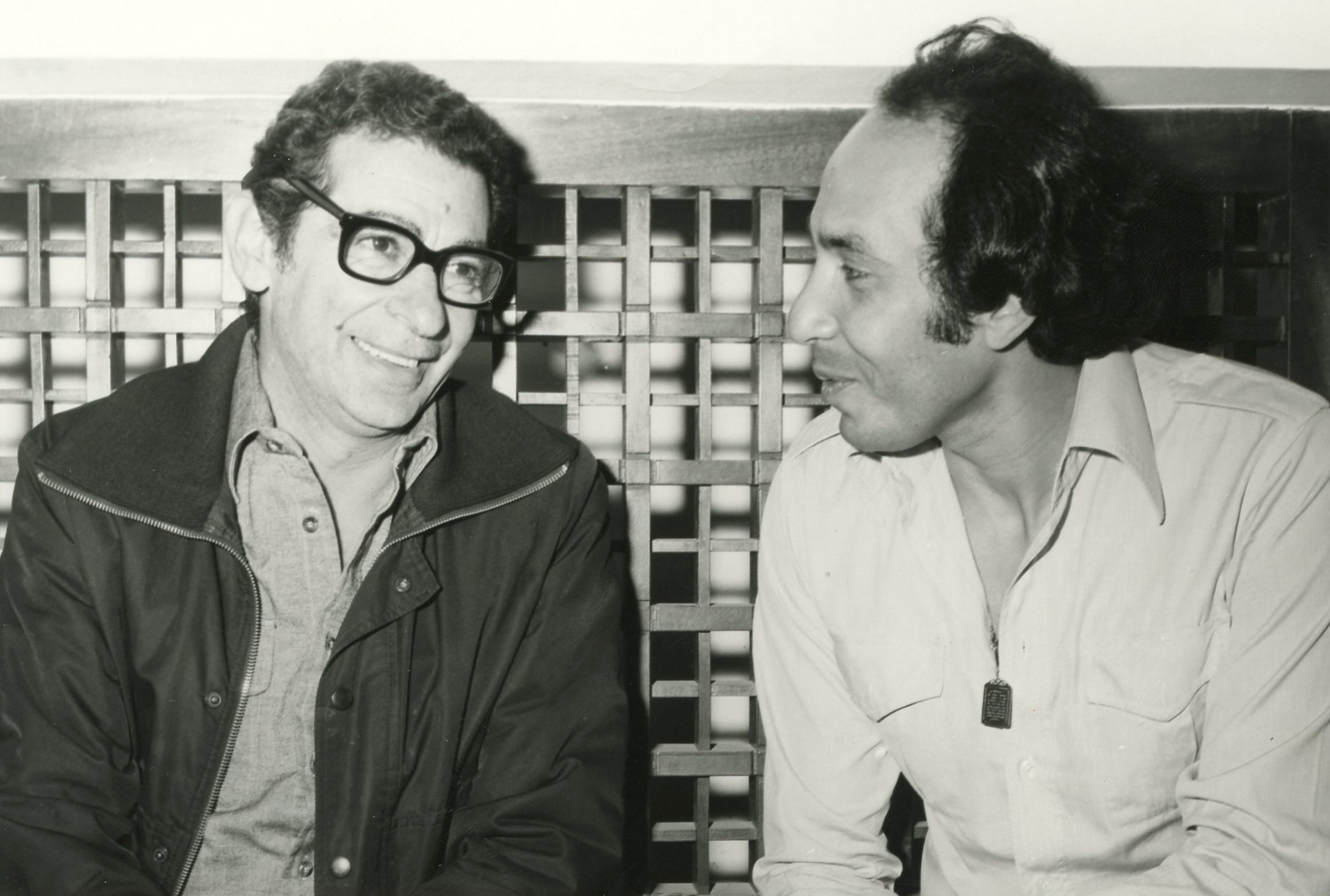
Interviewing Youssef Chahine in 1978

The two episodes are set to air sometime in 2024. Moreover, Kuwait TV recorded on February 19, 2024, an extensive interview exploring the multi-faceted happenings in Farouq's life. The two one-hour episodes are set to broadcast at a later date in 2024.

== A new beginning ==
By the fall of 1976, Farouq had fully settled in Kuwait and was determined to continue what he had started in Egypt. He was commissioned by the Kuwait Oil Company KOC to produce three films over the next two years. The first on The Liquid Petroleum Gas Project LPG, which was the largest Kuwaiti oil project to date. The second on the Deep Test Well, and the third, Fire on the massive fires ignited in the deep test well itself.

== Kuwait Cine-Club ==
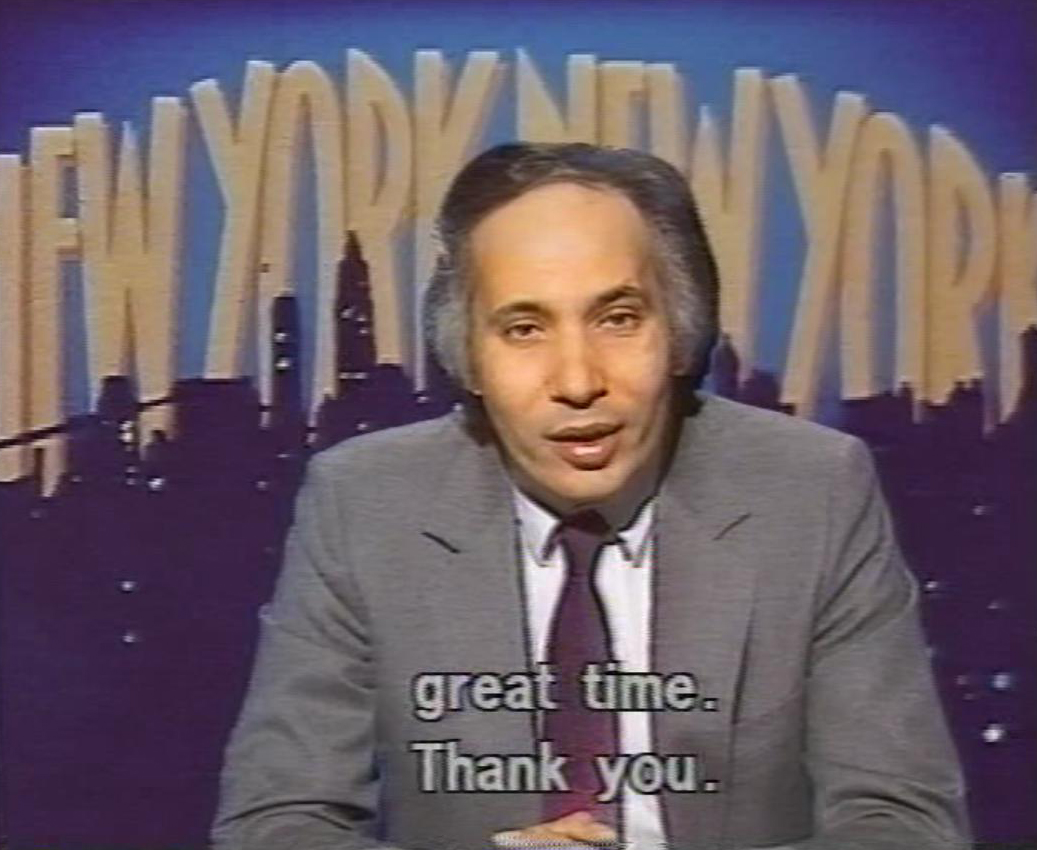
Presenting the Cine-Club Show in the 80's

In May 1977, the Kuwaiti daily newspaper Al-Siyasah (Politics) conducted a lengthy interview with Farouq, which led to his being invited to join the then newly formed Kuwait Cine-Club by the chairman of its board of directors, who in July 1977, asked Farouq to manage the club. The KCC was the first public association to be established in the Gulf region, for the express purpose of spreading film culture. Farouq's Cine-Club career went on for another 16 years. It was an incredibly fruitful association that led to the opening of over 60 film festivals celebrating diverse film cultures and myriad events. The club, always open to new experiences, regularly held screenings of independent features from around the world, and frequently hosted important figures from the film world.

The Palestinian Film Festival held from December 18 to 27, 1982, was one of the largest festivals organized by the club. It is the festival that brought together filmmakers from three continents with their diverse productions, which converged around presenting the justice of the Palestinian cause and the injustice to which the Palestinian people were subjected to for 35 years.

At one May 1983 festival; The Egyptian Film Festival, three generations of Egyptian filmmakers met for the first time. They were Ahmad Kamel Morsi (40s), Salah Abu Seif (50s), Youssef Chahine (50s), Kamal El Sheikh (50s), Shadi Abdul-Salam (60s), Hashem El Nahhas (70s) and Atef El Tayyeb (80s). International stars such as Anthony Quinn, Vanessa Redgrave, filmmakers like Mrinal Sen, Aparna Sen, and many others were guests of the KCC.

The club's periodicals and publications accompanying its activities contributed to spreading awareness of the importance of film culture in the region, which led to the establishment of other film communities. The Club thus advised the establishment of the Bahrain Cinema Club in 1981. In 1987 Farouq was invited by Abu Dhabi's Cultural Compound to launch the newly formed film venue. In 2009, Farouq was invited to be a consultant to the KCC.

== Vanessa ==
Perhaps one of the most notable and important figures participating in the 1978 3rd edition of the Baghdad International Film Festival on Palestine, was English actress and politician Vanessa Redgrave. Redgrave had just returned from the refugee camps and resistance bases located in southern Lebanon, where she was filming The Palestinian, a documentary by Roy Battersby.

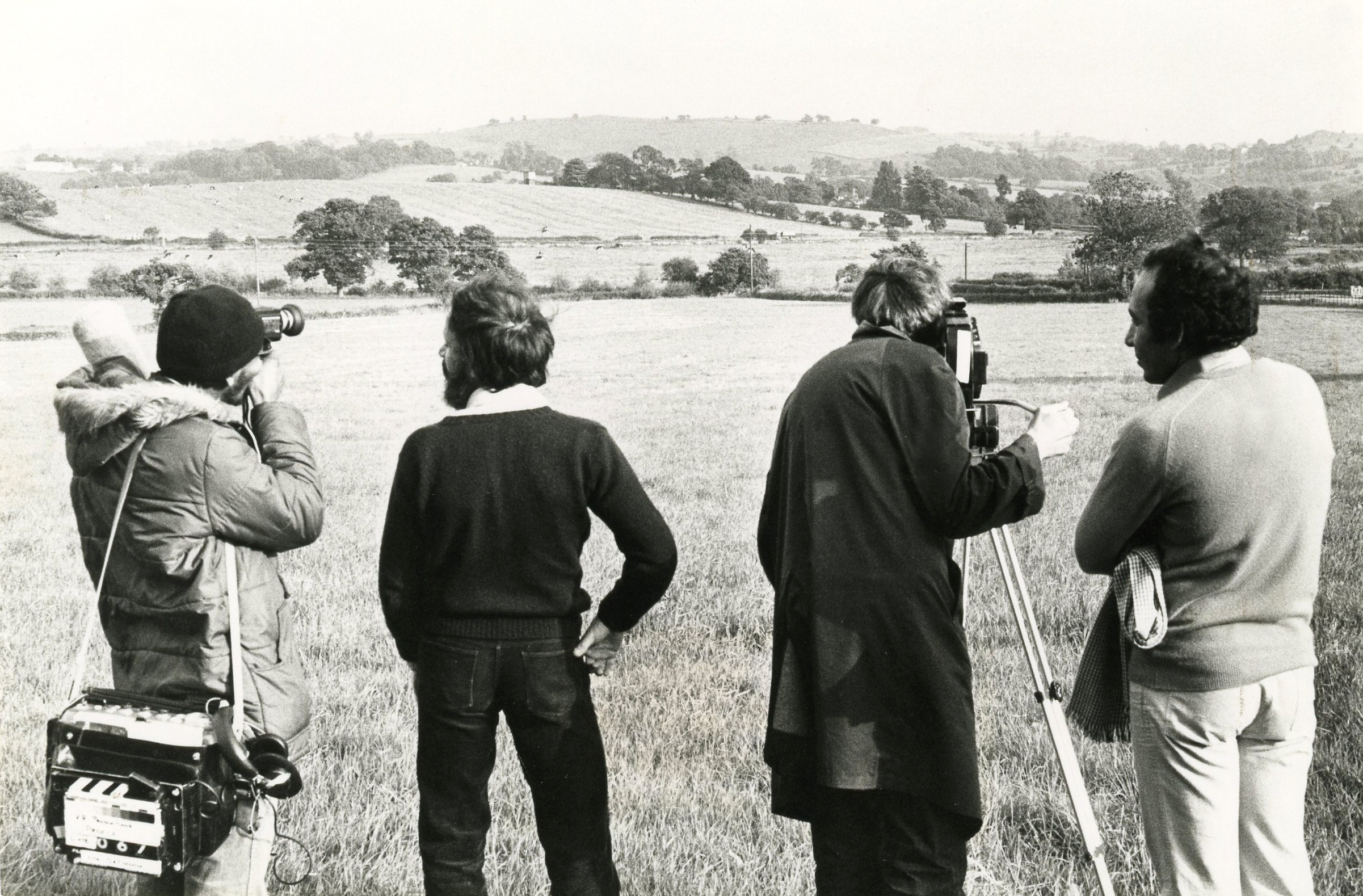
On location in North England with Director Roy Battersby, DP Chris Menges and Soundman Albert Bailey shooting 'Vanessa Talks with Farouk Abdulaziz'

Farouq was deeply moved by the audacity, courage and fairness, for the first time ever, to the Palestinian cause. That led him to interviewing Redgrave for the Baghdad television, followed by an interview published in Kuwait's Arab Times and Al-Siyasah (Politics). Weeks later Redgrave won the Academy Award for her powerful performance in Fred Zinnemann’s Julia (1977). Redgrave made comments during her acceptance speech on April 3, 1978, addressing 180 million viewers, which were deemed by US's Anti-Defamation League anti-Semitic. This caused tremendous controversy. This controversy was the main impetus behind Farouq's pursuing a documentary about her career as an actress and a political activist. Farouq wrote the questions and conducted the interview and Chris Menges filmed and Roy Battersby directed. The production rolled by May 1978 but took almost two years to complete due to Redgrave's commitment to filming Playing for Time, the CBS television film.

On March 30, 1979, Vanessa arrived in Kuwait upon an invitation from Farouq & Al Watan (Homeland) newspaper where she presented her documentary The Palestinian to a huge audience.

During her visit Vanessa was interviewed by Farouq for Kuwait TV. She was warmly welcomed by both top officials and the public. In one occasion, Vanessa announced her plans to produce another documentary about the Palestinian cause. Palestinians in the Occupied Land, Vanessa's follow-up documentary, was released in 1982.

Vanessa Talks with Farouk Abdul-Aziz was released in 1980. The film celebrates the last appearance of Sir Michael Redgrave as King Lear meeting, in the last scene of Shakespeare's tragedy, his daughter Cordelia – Vanessa. In her 1991 book, Vanessa Redgrave: An Autobiography, Redgrave remembered the circumstances around her coming to Kuwait and her interviews with Farouq Abdul-Aziz.

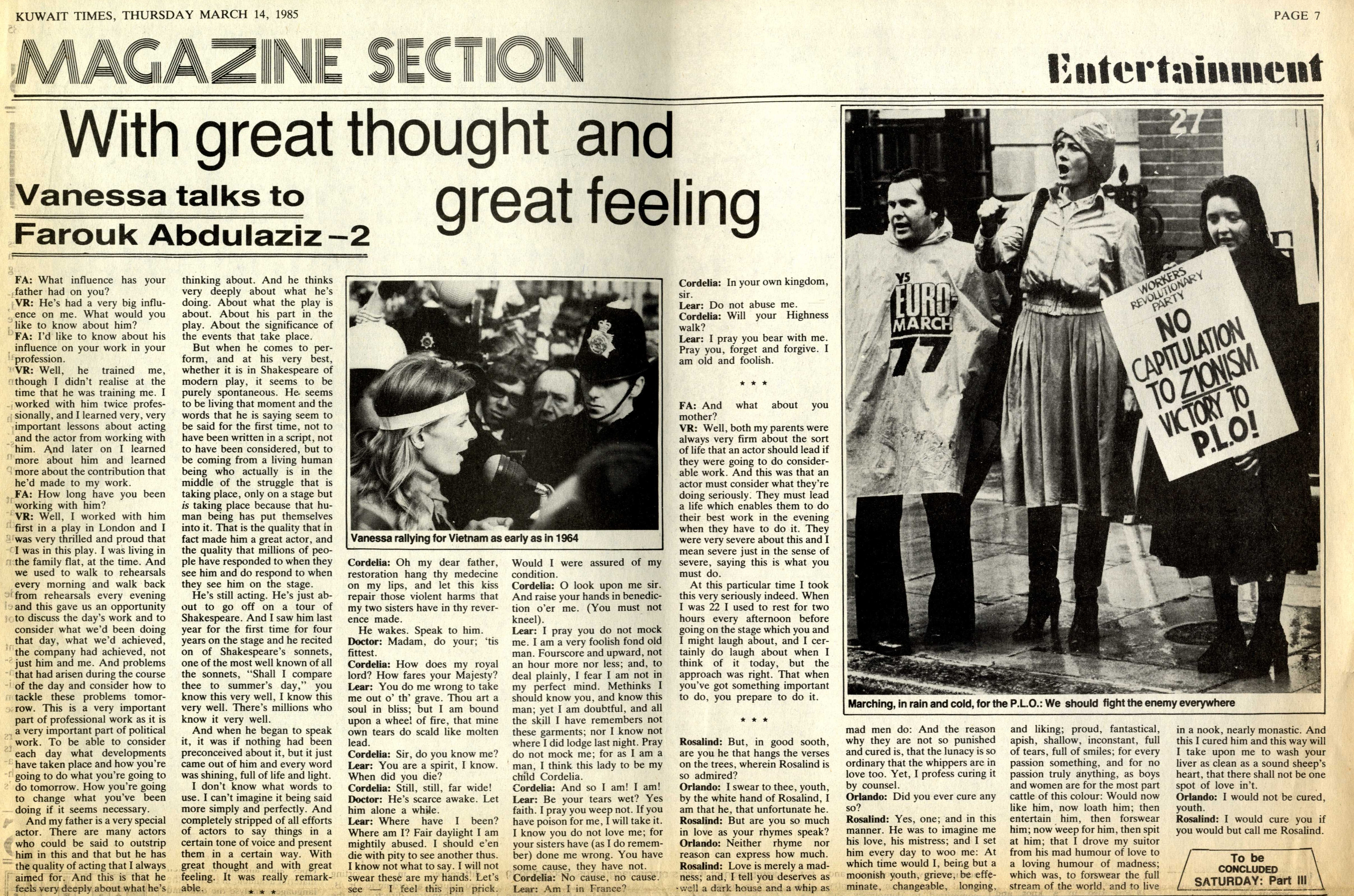
Part 2 of the three interview pieces

== Lion Of The Desert & Aqqad ==
Towards the end of 1978, Farouq was commissioned by Falcon International/Tring Entertainment in the United States and Britain, to write and produce a film documenting the production of Hollywood's blockbuster Lion of the Desert. A film produced and directed by Moustapha Akkad. The interviews included a selection of cast and crew.

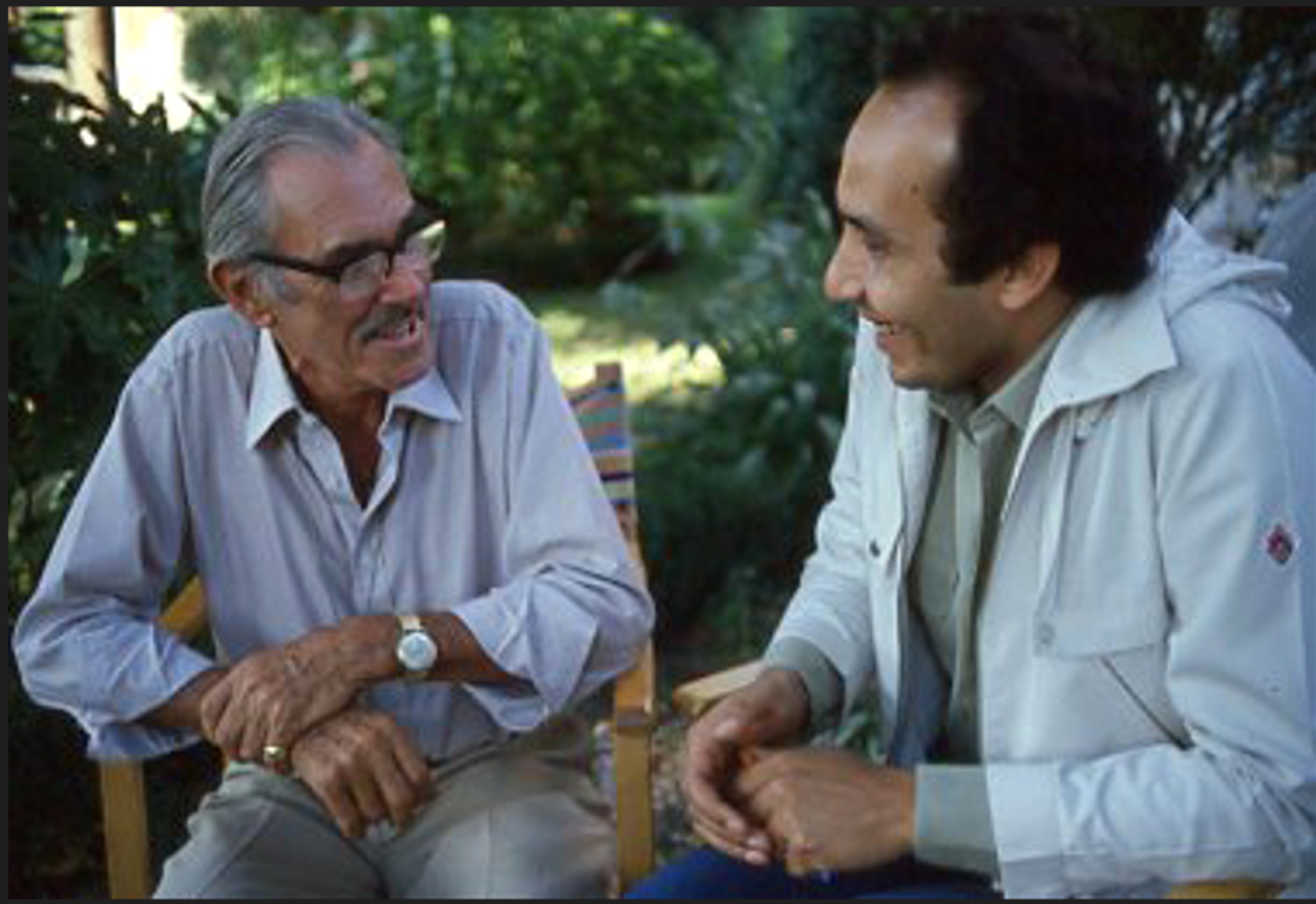
Interviewing Jack Hildyard in 1979

Academy Award winners like actors Anthony Quinn, Rod Steiger, Director of Photography Jack Hildyard in addition to actor Oliver Reed, and Director/Producer Moustapha Akkad. The documentary titled The Making of the Lion of the Desert was shown in 1981 in both Arabic and English versions.

== Cine-Club Show: The Power of Engagement ==
The Cine-Club show started broadcasting on Kuwait TV in October 1979. The first film featured was Fred Zinnemann’s A Man for All Seasons (1966). The program, written and presented by Farouq, was an immediate success and legitimate sensation across the Gulf region. Guests included Vanessa Redgrave, Anthony Quinn, and many other international stars and filmmakers. The show frequently celebrated obscure films and forgotten productions from around the world; films from China, Romania, Hungary, Italy, Germany, Sweden, North Africa and the USSR. The program which ran from October 1979 until December 1992 had a tremendous impact and contributed greatly to developing a generation of Kuwaiti and Gulf region film lovers. People who have gone on to seriously study film. Even Antonín Dvořák New World Symphony 4th Movement, Cine-Club's opening sequence music, has become a household piece for those film buffs. The program returned briefly for a series of shows for one year 2001 – 2002.

== Juror ==
In April 1980 Farouq was invited to participate in the international jury of the International Short Film Festival in Oberhausen (Oberhausen Kurtzfilmtages). Farouq had previously participated in the jury of the National Festival of Documentary and Short Films in Egypt in 1976.

The list of jury committees included Farouq's representation of the Egyptian Film Critics Association EFCA in the International Federation of Film Critics FIPRESCI juries at the Cannes International Film Festival sessions of 1984, 1985 and 1987. In 1995, Farouq returned to participate in the international jury at the Ismailia International Documentary and Short Film Festival in Egypt. Farouq was a member of the jury and of the Supreme Committee of the Kuwait Film Festival held on March 17, 2017. In 2019, he participated in the jury of the Beyond International Film Festival in its first session in the State of Kuwait.

== Welcome to The Silk Road ==
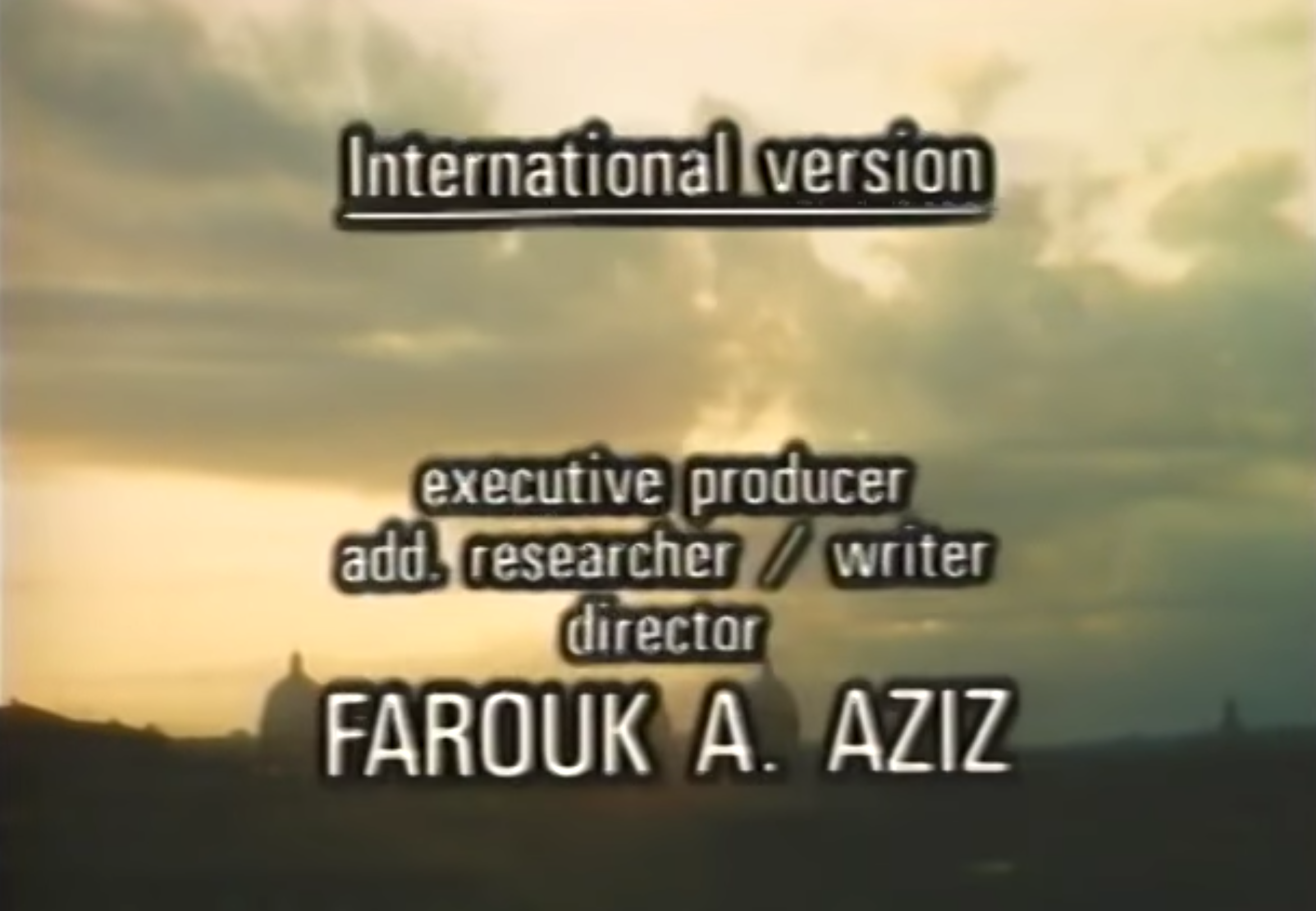
One plate of 'The Silk Road' P2 End Credits

The relationship with the Japanese Broadcasting Corporation NHK began when Farouq produced the Arabic language version of The Great National Parks of Europe (1986), a 10-hour Swiss production. The Japanese network commissioned Farouq to produce the international English language version of their 18-hour documentary series, The Silk Road – Part Two. Farouq ended up co-writing the voice over for the Islamic regions featured in the documentary. The series started airing in 1987 on many major channels such as Britain's ITV and Canada's History Channel. Farouq's involvement in this production directly led to him being commissioned by the Turkish Ministry of Culture and Tourism to produce "Merhaba (Welcome)", an elevated travel film on the history, culture, and art of Turkey.

== Baraka ==
In the aftermath of the Gulf War of 1991, known as Operation Desert Storm, Farouq spent a year working as a researcher and producer of documentaries showcasing stories from Kuwait for a number of networks, including UK's BBC, Channel 4, and US's networks such as CBS and NBC. Farouq also produced the Kuwait segment for Baraka, the high profileTodd AO 70mm documentary film produced by Mark Magidson and directed by Ron Fricke.

== Feature Films: Unaccomplished Business ==
In the mid-nineties, Farouq was busy submitting proposals to European film commissions to help produce his first international feature film; Love in Exile, based on Egyptian writer Baha’ Taher’s massively successful novel. The story takes place in an unnamed European capital.

After signing a co-production agreement with the Irish company Meem Productions, and announcing the launch of the project at the Cannes International Film Festival’s special editions of two publications: Screen International and Moving Pictures on May 17, 1996, two European funds decided to withdraw from the financing deal due to the author and team not being able to come to terms over their request to remove or soften scenes involving Jewish character under the pretext of the existence of a law related to anti-Semitism. Author Baha’ Taher's response was absolute rejection, which led to the cessation of the development of the project. This was the fate of another project, although the production was not hindered by the same circumstances. In 1985, Farouq signed a contract with the International Television and Film Company in Cairo to write, produce and direct his first feature film; Ghareeb Dreams. However, major creative and production style differences prevented the work from being completed.

== Back to the Radio ==
In mid-1999, Farouq returned to writing and presenting film programs, but this time on Kuwait Radio. One show, titled The Comedians aired for a year, while other shows like Cinema and the World, Cinema on the Radio, and Films and Melodies lasted for several years.

== A Versatile Career ==
The versatility of Farouq's career hit an all-time high in the nineties – as he founded a company based in Ottawa, Canada, with CoreVideoCom and another partner, called Muslim Mind Inc. The primary purpose of the company was to produce 13 twenty-six minute episodes entitled The Muslim Mind, which dealt with the then tense relationship between Islam and the West. The project was welcomed by Ontario's CBC, Vision TV and US's PBS. Despite the enthusiasm from all involved, the already developed material had to be shelved due to lack of enough funding. Farouq then shifted his focus to researching and writing feasibility studies for the establishment of a global production company and two satellite channels (1997 – 1999).

== Media Consulting and Television Production ==
In the early 1980s thru 1990, Farouq had been advising two ministers of information in Kuwait on how to bring cinema back into the forefront as a cultural weapon. In 2004, he resumed this job and provided media advice to a number of Kuwaiti government agencies. This went on until 2018, when Farouq had to step back due to other commitments. Farouq was commissioned to produce a number of documentaries and television shows for the Ministry of Awqaf (Endowments) and Martyrs’ Bureau as well as Government Restructuring Program of Kuwait, including Islamic Art: Lights and Shadows (1999) and The Imprint of the Soul (2000), a film about the Kuwaiti resistance and martyrdom during the Iraqi invasion. He also produced Love Letters (2000) and I Love Myself (2001), an 11-episode series on dealing with the lingering psychological effects of the Iraqi invasion. Another project was To Be or Not to Be (2006), a film about the employment of Kuwaiti youth in relation to personal ambition. In 2007 came Barira, a film about the problems of domestic labor in Kuwait, and in 2009 he produced Islamic Art: The Heritage of a Nation.

== Science vs. Religion; Uncharted Ground ==
Farouq's discovery of the interesting results reached by the French researcher and Gastroenterologist Dr. Maurice Bucaille, in his studies on the relationship between sacred texts and science, had left a great impact on him. Bucaille became famous after he published his first book, La Bible, le Coran et la Science (The Bible, the Qur’an and Science) in 1976. The bestseller seminal book has been in distribution for well over 40 years, and has been translated to about 15 languages. This discovery had motivated Farouq's interest in studying this relationship. It is a study that has continued showing in visual and literary works for more than 15 years.

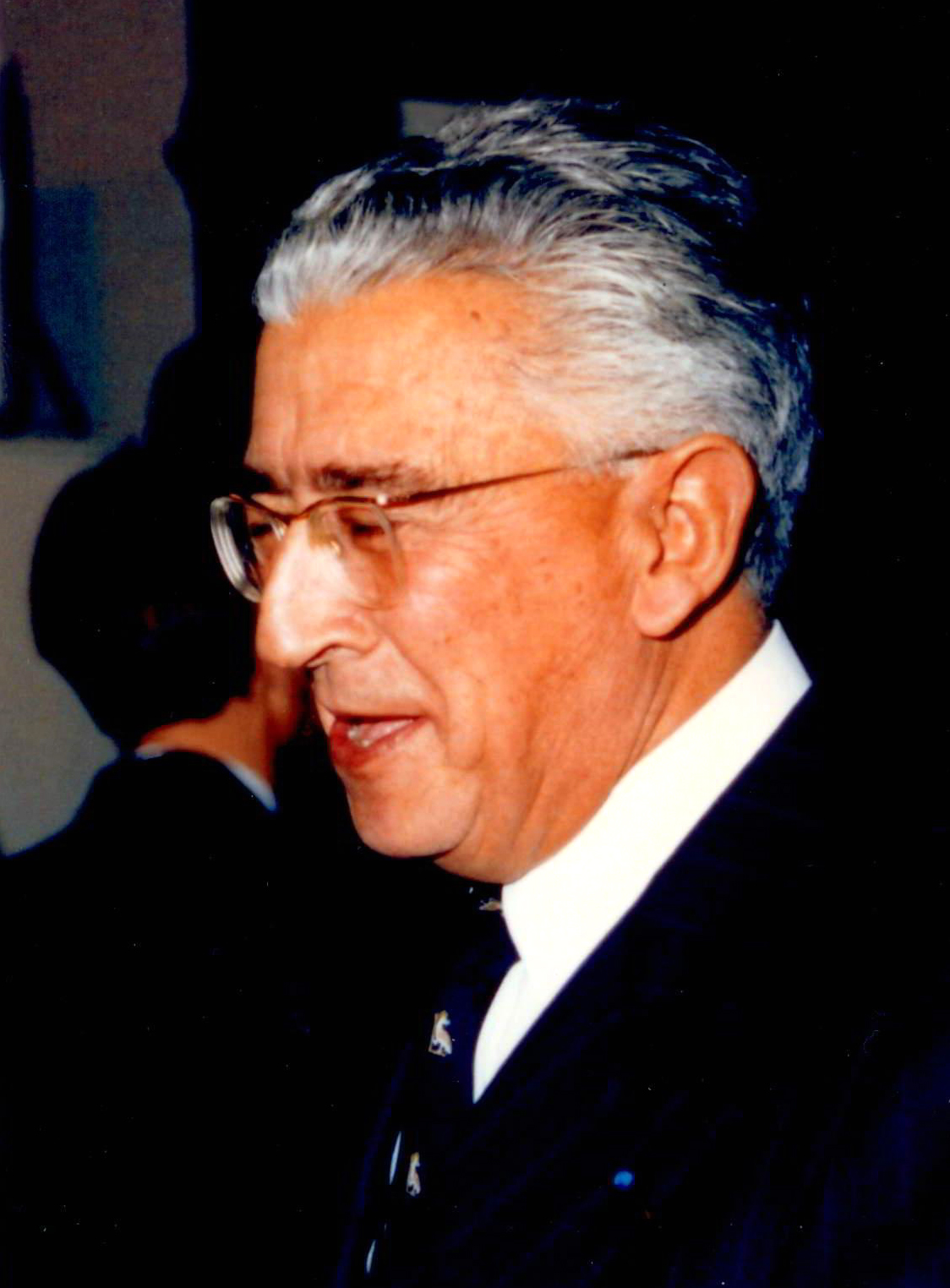
Maurice Bucaille presented to Abdul-Aziz in 2008.

And so, in April 2008, Farouq started producing two documentary projects simultaneously in both Arabic and English versions based on Dr. Bucaille's book. The 2 year production yielded Maurice and the Pharaoh, and From Microcosm to Macrocosm, both of which were released in the fall of 2010. Both films premiered at the Al Jazeera Documentary Film Festival of 2010, and were later shown at the Islamic Society of North America's ISNA Film Festival in July 2010. Another screening took place in September 2010, at the IMAX exhibition hall at the Scientific Center in Kuwait. In December 2010, the International Jury of Kuwait's Fahad Al Ahmad International Award for Works Promoting Islam announced that both documentaries had won the award for the outstanding creativity in scrutinizing the connection between Islam and Science.

The Nasser Abdul Al Muhsen Al Saeed Foundation in Kuwait financed the production of the two films.

The screening of the two films coincided with the publication of a study written by Dr. Stefano Bigliardi, currently professor of philosophy of science at Al Akhawayn University in Morocco, who had contacted Farouq in 2010 with the aim of obtaining copies of the two films for the purposes of his study entitled: The Strange Case of Dr. Bucaille: Notes for a Re-examination. Bigliardi considered the two films and the website dedicated to Dr. Bucaille's legacy, which Farouq created in 2010, as references containing verified information suitable for academic citation in his study.

British officer Richard Varley was one of a group who talked about his experience with scientific references in the Qur’an in the film Signs & Voices (2012).

The cosmic expansion as imagined in the film Expanding Universe (2012)

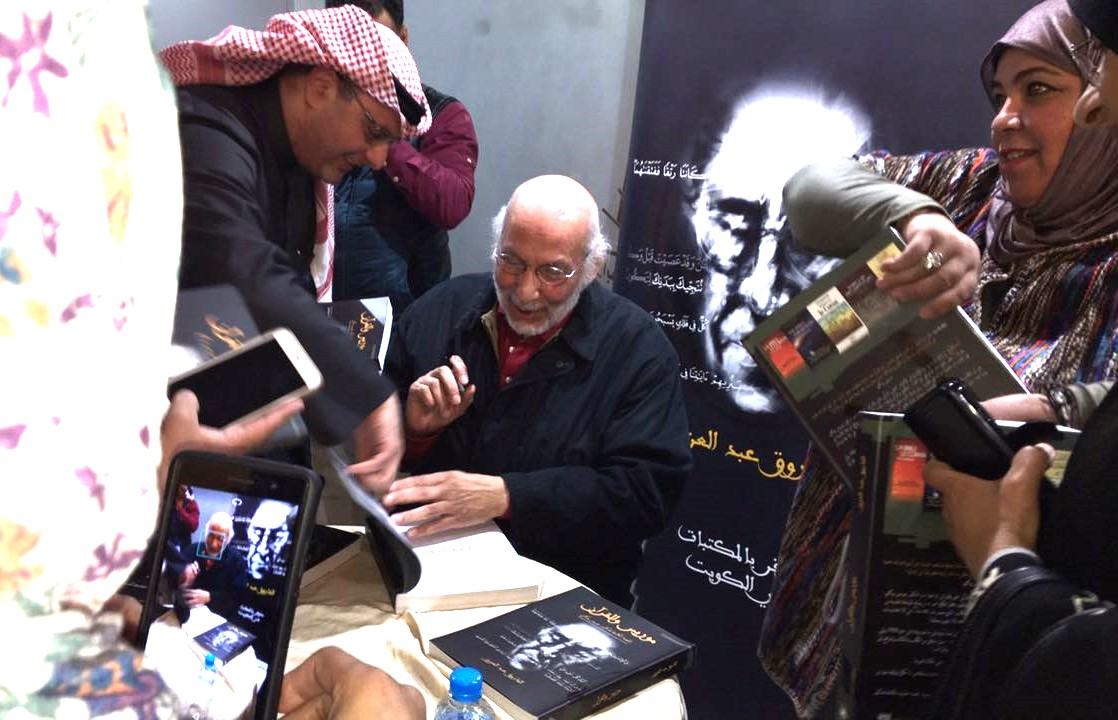
Signing 1st Book on Maurice & the Qur'an - Arabic Version in 2016

A third documentary film, about Qur’anic scientific references related to Astrophysics, was produced in both Arabic and English versions. This film looked at the same subject from a different angle and was titled Gates of Heaven. The film premiered on the IMAX screen at the Kuwait Scientific Center in March 2012. With the expansion of research in understanding the scientific references in the Qur’an, Farouq produced five new films that were uploaded in October 2014 on his YouTube channel, alfarouqchannel. These films are funded by Kuwait's Bodoor Foundation.

The first film deals with how the Great Split or what is known as The Big Bang Theory relates to a Qur’anic verse, while Expanding Universe explains the constant acceleration of this process as referred to in the Qur’an. Hobok: Cosmic Web goes into the great cosmic architecture and its components inspired by the Qur’anic word: Hobok (Interlaced Threads).

The film Signs & Voices presents the indelible impact of the scientific references in the Qur’an left on a group of European reverts. The fifth film, In Her Orbit, comes as a review of several concepts related to planet Earth, including the idea that it is not unlike a spherical ball rotating day and night, and that it is just another planet in an open universe and not its center, ideas that were unknown 1400 years ago.

After more than two years of academic research, Farouq published his first book to be of a referential value. In November 2016, he presented his book Maurice and the Qur’an: The Complete Story of Dr. Maurice Bucaille in a lecture commissioned by Kuwait's National Council for Culture, Arts and Letters during the 41st book fair. The 575-page book contains 20 chapters and 20 sections of appendices and footnotes. The importance of the book is highlighted by the utmost care given for the academic documentation of the information sources of the story of the French Gastroenterologist. In the 20 chapters, we learn about the most important issues that preoccupied Bucaille before his research on the relationship between the Holy Scriptures and modern science. The writer then discusses in detail the stages of transformation that Bucaille went through regarding his preconceived view of Islam, which finally led to his interest in enrolling in a three-year course to study Arabic at the University of Paris in 1970 in order to be able to properly read and understand the Qur’an in Arabic, only to discover the existence of about two hundred Qur’anic verses in close relation to modern science. The book deals with the accusations made against Bucaille by writers, journalists and scientists of his bias towards Islam and imposing unscientific interpretations on Qur’anic verses.

Farouq's book refutes these accusations with scientific evidence in agreement with Bucaille's own perspective, with special emphasis on the thorough historical research that Bucaille conducted resulting in the identification of the Pharaoh of the Exodus. The book contains an Arabic translation of two lectures given by Bucaille at the French National Academy of Medicine in Paris in 1976. It's also rife with materials sourced from the French Visual and Audio Archive INA, published for the first time in Arabic. Moreover, the book also presents rare materials and interviews with some of those who knew him personally.

In 2016 Farouq produced a documentary, in both Arabic and English, about what many consider to be Dr. Bucaille's most impressive achievement; the identification of the Pharaoh of Exodus. The film's title: Who is Moses Pharaoh .

At the end of 2017, Farouq published the second book, a continuation of the story of Bucaille, under the title: Maurice and the Qur’an: From Pharaoh to the Big Bang.

In the same year, Farouq produced a documentary film about the life of Dr. Bucaille and his experience with scientific references in the Qur’an in two versions, in Arabic and English, entitled: The True Story of Dr. Bucaille.

The journey of studying Dr. Bucaille's legacy was completed in 2022 with the production of a documentary film pondering the outcome of twenty-five years of Bucaille's contemplation of the Qur’an, entitled: Did Dr. Bucaille Revert to Islam? The film boasts introducing archival material and rare footage as well as exclusive interviews on the subject.

The third book of Farouq's was published in early 2018 and was titled: Knitted by the Stars which deals with some Astrophysical phenomena in relation to references contained in Qur’anic verses. Then, in the same year, two books were published in Arabic and English: Who Would Have Known That 14 Centuries Ago, in which a collection of various scientific phenomena are scrutinized in relation to a select of Qur’anic verses.

Farouq spent the better part of 2020 doing research for a 30-episode program, produced and presented in a style totally innovative to the way Arab networks usually present shows, on references in the Qur’an. These references (scientific, historical, and societal) spawned episodes on various subjects such as the May, 25th murder of George Floyd and the global COVID-19 Pandemic.

In 2021, Farouq produced, presented, and directed the first season of the television program: Evidence: Science and History in the Shadow of the Qu’ran. 15 episodes have been produced to date.

Farouq spent 2023 writing an upcoming program to be produced in the style of Evidence, titled Life before Life – a show based on research by prominent Western Embryologists. The program showcases their modern, medical perspectives on Qur’anic verses relating to life in the womb. This project is due to be released, in five languages, in October 2024.
