= Olivier de Sagazan =

French artist, painter, sculptor and performer

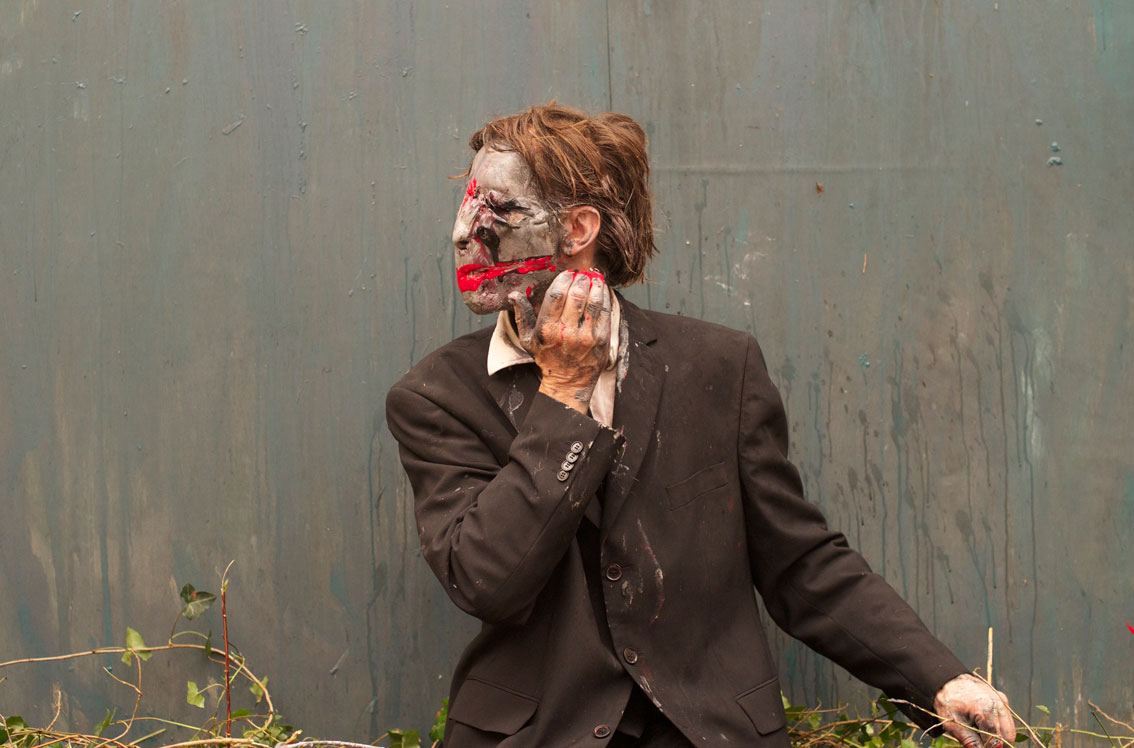
- Olivier de Sagazan in "Transformation" (2008).
- Born: 1959 (age 66–67); Brazzaville, Republic of the Congo
- Known for: Performance art, sculptor, painter
- Website: olivierdesagazan.com

Olivier de Sagazan (born 1959 in Brazzaville, Congo) is a French artist, painter, sculptor and performer. His most famous performance, "Transfiguration", was created in 1998, with more than 300 performances in 25 countries.

De Sagazan has collaborated with such artists as:

- Mylène Farmer for the music video À l'ombre
- FKA Twigs
- Ron Fricke for the 2011 film Samsara
- Qiu Yang for the movie O produced by Hou Hsiao-hsien
- Gareth Pugh and Nick Knight
- Wim Vandekeybus
- David Wahl

He is the father of singer-songwriter and musician Zaho de Sagazan.

== Television ==
In Channel Zero: Candle Cove, de Sagazan portrays The Skin Taker.

== See also ==
Performance art
