= Fabas, Haute-Garonne =

Fabas
- Commune
- Location of Fabas
- Location within France Location within Occitanie
- Coordinates: 43°18′52″N 0°53′40″E
- Country: France
- Region: Occitania
- Department: Haute-Garonne
- Arrondissement: Saint-Gaudens
- Canton: Cazères
- Intercommunality: Cœur et Coteaux du Comminges

Government
  - Mayor (2020–2026): Alain Estrade
- Area^{1}: 18.68 km^{2} (7.21 sq mi)
- Elevation: 340 m (1,120 ft)
- Highest elevation: 357 m (1,171 ft)
- Lowest elevation: 256 m (840 ft)
- Population (2023): 196
  - Density: 10.5/km^{2} (27.2/sq mi)
- Time zone: UTC+01:00 (CET)
  - Summer (DST): UTC+02:00 (CEST)
- INSEE/Postal code: 31178 /31230
- ^{1} French Land Register data, which excludes lakes, ponds, glaciers > 1 km^{2} (0.386 sq mi or 247 acres) and river estuaries.

Fabas is a commune in the Haute-Garonne department in southwestern France.

== Population ==
Historical population
Year	Pop.	±% p.a.
1968	277	—
1975	239	−2.09%
1982	244	+0.30%
1990	206	−2.09%
1999	214	+0.42%
2007	210	−0.24%
2012	208	−0.19%
2017	201	−0.68%
2023	196	−0.42%
Source: INSEE

== See also ==
- Communes of the Haute-Garonne department
