= Zaho de Sagazan =

French musician

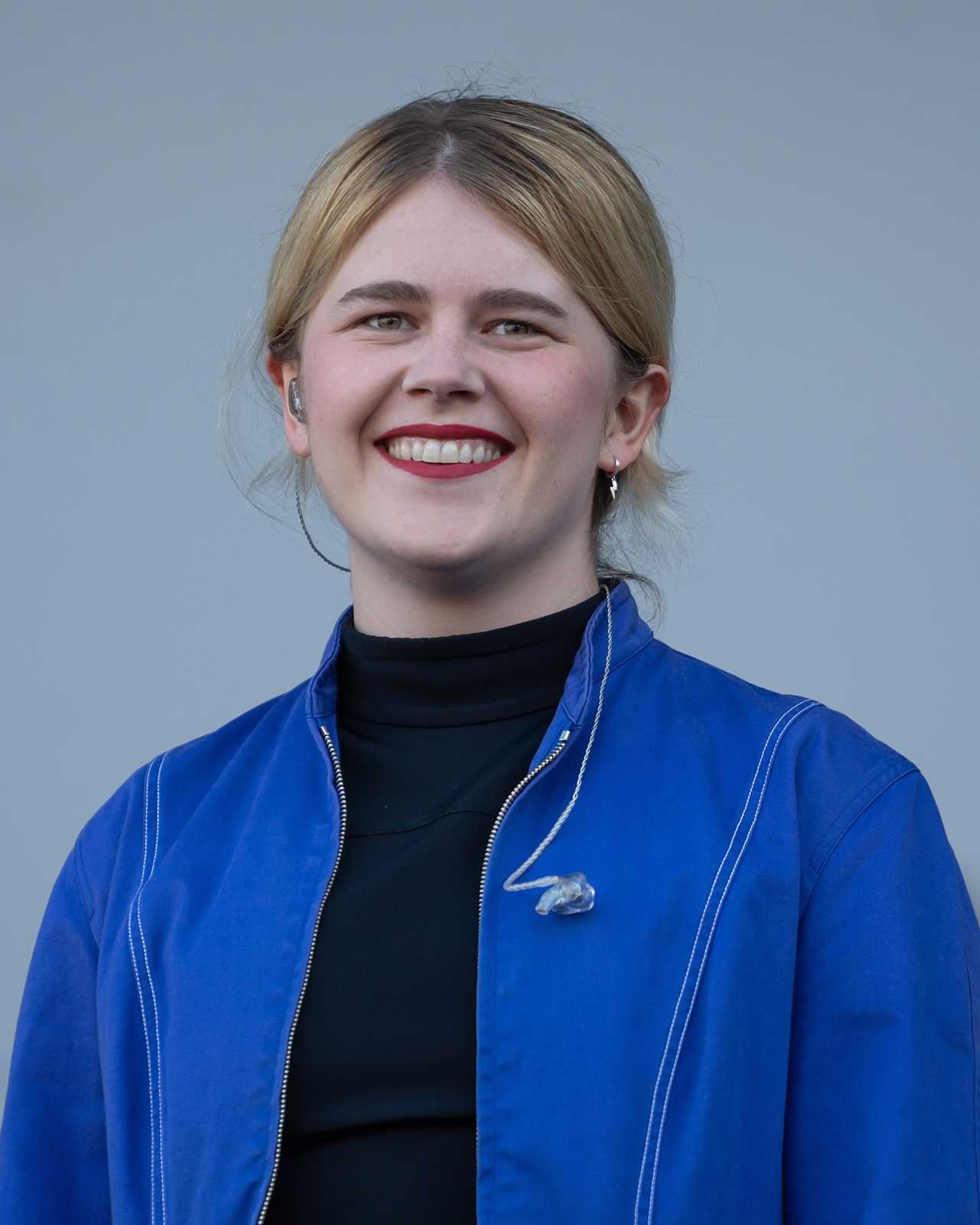
- Zaho de Sagazan in 2024

Background information
- Born: Zaho Mélusine Le Moniès de Sagazan; 28 December 1999 (age 26); Saint-Nazaire, France
- Genres: Variété; Electro
- Occupations: Singer; songwriter; composer
- Instruments: Vocals; piano; synthesizer
- Years active: 2021–present
- Label: Virgin Records France
- Website: zahodesagazan.store

Zaho Mélusine Le Moniès de Sagazan (French pronunciation: [za.o me.ly.zin lə mɔ.njɛs də sa.ɡa.zɑ̃]; born 28 December 1999), known as Zaho de Sagazan, is a French singer-songwriter and musician. In March 2023, she released her debut album La Symphonie des éclairs which attracted positive acclaim. In February 2024, she was nominated in five categories at the 39th Victoires de la Musique ceremony and won four prizes including those for original song and album of the year.

== Biography ==
Zaho Le Moniès de Sagazan was born on December 28, 1999, in Saint-Nazaire in France. She is the daughter of painter, sculptor and performer Olivier de Sagazan and Gaëlle Le Rouge de Rusunan, who works as a teacher. She has three older sisters and a twin. She is the cousin of the director Lorraine de Sagazan. During her childhood in Saint-Nazaire, she practiced dance extensively, often up to seven hours a week. She studied at and graduated from the Aristide-Briand high school, with a concentration in science. She went to Nantes to study business and administration management, working for a year as a care assistant in a nursing home before embarking on a singing career.

=== Musical career ===
Zaho de Sagazan started posting musical videos of herself on Instagram in 2015. It included many covers and some original compositions. In 2016, in her first stage appearance, she performed La Bonne Étoile at the Simone Veil theater in Saint-Nazaire during the Salade concert at the Aristide-Briand high school. She continued to appear at the theater until 2019.

From 2021, she started participating in numerous music festivals such as Printemps de Bourges, Nuits de Fourvière, Les Francofolies de La Rochelle, Les Escales de Saint-Nazaire, Rock en Seine and Les Rockomotives de Vendôme. In September 2021, Zaho de Sagazan performed on the stage of the Vendanges musicales in Charnay in Beaujolais. In 2021, she played with Mansfield.TYA at the Trianon theater and at the Olympia in Paris which brought her recognition. At the Trans Musicales de Rennes in 2022, she performed on the stage during the five evenings of the festival.

On March 31, 2023, Zaho de Sagazan released her first album, La Symphonie des éclairs , which was released by Virgin Records France. Though she had a few singles beforehand, her first appearances on stage for the new album and the subsequent media coverage allowed her to gain fame and notoriety. In a few months, she went from being almost unknown to a high hope of the French music. The album was certified Platinum in April 2024 after reaching the threshold of 100,000 copies sold.

In January 2024, she was nominated for the Music Moves Europe Talent Awards. Shortly after that, she received five nominations at the 39th Les victoires de la Musique ceremony where she won the awards for best original song, best album, best stage revelation and best female revelation.

In May 2024, she performed at the opening of the Cannes Film Festival by covering David Bowie's song Modern Love in tribute to the president of the jury Greta Gerwig.

On August 11, 2024, de Sagazan opened the 2024 Summer Olympics closing ceremony in Paris. She sang "Sous le ciel de Paris", originally sung by French songstress Édith Piaf, accompanied by the choir of the Académie Haendel-Hendrix.

In 2026, de Sagazan had a guest role in the final season of the German TV-series Babylon Berlin, along with the song "Je rêve" from La Symphonie des éclairs featured in full.

== Style ==
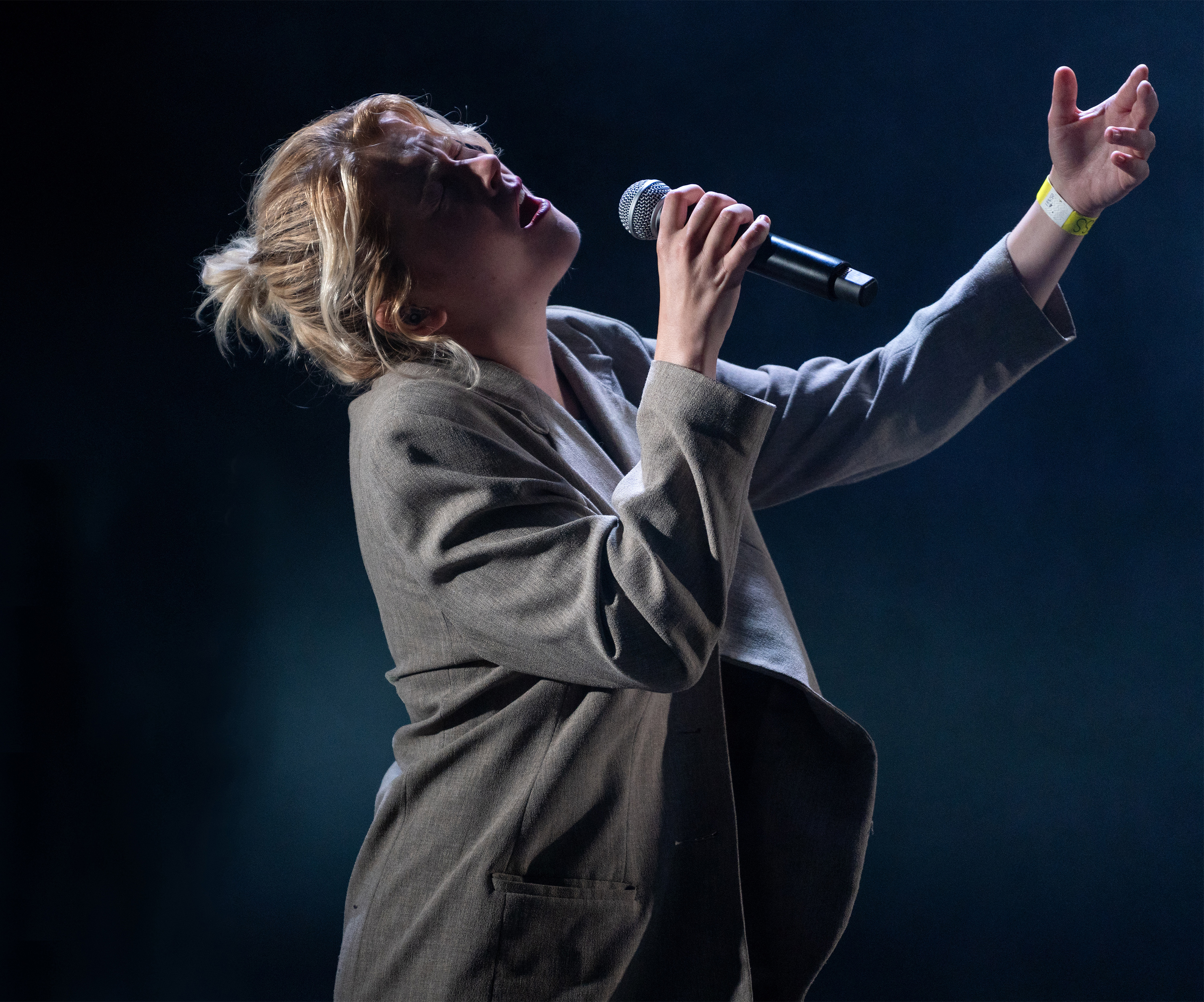
Zaho de Sagazan in 2023

She has said that she was passionate about electronic music from the 1980s, from Krautrock to Darksynth, while being encouraged by French songs, notably by Jacques Brel and Barbara. She also cites Tom Odell as one of her main influences. On stage, she is often accompanied by Tom Geffray, multi-instrumentalist, and musicians from the Inuit group (Alexis Delong and Pierre Cheguillaume).

== Discography ==
=== Studio album ===
- La Symphonie des Éclairs (2023)

=== Singles ===
- La déraison (2022)
- Suffisamment (2022)
- Les dormantes (2022)
- Tristesse (2023)
- La Symphonie des éclairs (2023)
- Dis-moi que tu m’aimes (2023)
- Aspiration (2024)
- Modern Love (David Bowie cover) (2024)
- Ô Travers (2024)
- Old Friend (featuring Tom Odell) (2024)

== Awards and honors ==
- 2022: Chorus Prize of the Department of Hauts-de-Seine
- 2023: Joséphine Prize
- 2023: Francis-Lemarque Prize
- 2024: Award for "Best emerging European artist of the year 2023" and "Public Choice Award" at the Music Moves Europe Awards at the Eurosonic Noorderslag in Groningen
- 2024: Golden Q award of the musical revelation on TMC
- 2024: Victoires de la Musique awards in the categories "Original song", "Best album", "Scene revelation" and "Female revelation”
