= Étienne de Molinier =

French Catholic priest (1580-1650)

- Born: 1580; Toulouse, France
- Died: 1650 (aged 69–70); Paris, France
- Occupation: Theologian

Étienne de Molinier (1580-1650) was a French Christian theologian and Thomist. He argued that painting was a metaphor for God's creation.

== Works ==
- Les Politiques chrétiennes, ou Tableau des vertus politiques considérées en l'estat chrestien. Paris: M. Collet. 1621.
- Le Lys du Val de Garaison. Tolose [Toulouse]: R. Colomiez. 1630.
- Le Banquet sacré de l'Eucharistie pour l'octave du Saint-Sacrement. Tolose [Toulouse]: A. Colomiez. 1635.
