= Chronos (film) =

1985 film by Ron Fricke

- Directed by: Ron Fricke
- Written by: Constantine Nicholas; Genevieve Nicholas
- Produced by: Ron Fricke; Mark Magidson
- Cinematography: Ron Fricke
- Edited by: Ron Fricke; Alton Walpole
- Music by: Michael Stearns
- Production companies: Reuben H. Fleet Space Theater; S.E.M. La Géode; Magidson Films; Canticle Films
- Distributed by: MacGillivray Freeman Films
- Release date: May 1985
- Running time: 42 minutes
- Country: United States

Chronos (/ˈkrɒnoʊs/ KRON-ohs) is a 1985 non-narrative documentary film directed and photographed by Ron Fricke, with music by Michael Stearns. Shot on IMAX film in eight countries, it consists primarily of time-lapse footage captured with custom-built cameras. Originally released in IMAX theaters in May 1985, it has since been made available on VHS, DVD, HD DVD, and Blu-ray.

== Synopsis ==
Chronos is 42 minutes long and has no actors or dialogue. The soundtrack consists of a single continuous piece by composer Michael Stearns. Filmed in dozens of locations on five continents, the film relates to the concept of time passing on different scales—the bulk of the film covers the history of civilization, from pre-history to Egypt to Rome to Late Antiquity to the rise of Western Europe in the Middle Ages to the Renaissance to the modern era. It centers on European themes but not exclusively. Other time scales include the passing of seasons, the passing of night and day, and the passing shadows of the sun in an afternoon to the passing of people on the street. These themes are intermingled with symbolic meaning.

== Background ==
Chronos shares its particular style with the film Koyaanisqatsi (1982), for which Ron Fricke was the cinematographer, as well as his later films Sacred Site and Baraka (1992). The theme of the film is "the celebration of life", and does not include the themes of technology as the culprit for society or "life out of balance", which were present in Koyaanisqatsi. American Cinematographer described the film as "a musical poem praising the evolution of Western man from Cairo to Los Angeles." The film was produced by Canticle Films, a production company founded by Fricke. Funding for Chronos came from the seed money acquired through the publicity surrounding the production of Koyaanisqatsi.

Fricke designed and built a 65 mm camera for the film, which included a motion control system for the film's cinematography. The director also used the system in his later films.

Michael Stearns, while composing the soundtrack for the film, used a custom-made instrument called "The Beam" to generate many of the sounds he required. The Beam was 12 feet (3.7 m) long, made of extruded aluminum with 24 piano strings of gauge 19-22.

The name of the film comes from the Ancient Greek word χρόνος, khrónos, which means time and is also the source to many modern terms related to time, such as chronology, synchronous, etc.

== Awards ==
- International OMNI-MAX Film Festival: "Grand Prize Winner"
