= Galata Mevlevi Lodge Museum =

Museum in Istanbul, Turkey

Coordinates: 41.0280°N 28.9751°E

The Galata Mevlevi Lodge Museum, also known as the Galata Mevlevihanesi or Kulekapı Mevlevi Lodge, is a historic site located in Istanbul, Turkey. Established in 1491, it is the oldest Mevlevi lodge in the city and serves as a museum dedicated to Ottoman literature and Mevlevi culture.

== Historical background ==
Built on land previously owned by Iskender Pasha, a prominent governor, the Galata Mevlevi Lodge was founded during Sultan Bayezid II's reign. The lodge has undergone several restorations, especially after a major fire in 1766. Subsequent repairs were made during the reigns of Sultans Selim III, Mahmud II, and Abdülmecid. It functioned until 1925 and was later restored between 1967 and 1972.

== Architectural features ==
The lodge complex includes:

- Semahane (Ritual Hall): Featuring an octagonal layout and 18th-century Baroque elements, this hall displays Turkish musical instruments and manuscripts of Ottoman poets, including Sheikh Galib. The master's quarters and the Sultan's prayer area are located upstairs.
- Dervish Cells: These stone rooms, aligned in a row, were used for dervish accommodation.
- Mausoleums:
- Sheikh Galib Mausoleum: Constructed in the early 19th century by Halet Said Efendi, it houses notable figures like Sheikh Galib and Ismail Ankaravi.
- Halet Said Efendi Mausoleum: Built concurrently with Sheikh Galib's mausoleum, it also features a square layout and contains graves of prominent individuals.
- Library: Located on the top floor, this library, founded by Halet Said Efendi, holds 3,455 volumes.
- Fountain and Clock Room: Positioned near the entrance, these structures were erected in the early 19th century.
- Cemetery (Treasury): This cemetery includes graves of former masters, their families, and other notable figures such as Humbaracı Ahmed Pasha and İbrahim Müteferrika.

== Cultural significance ==
The Galata Mevlevi Lodge Museum is crucial for preserving traditions of the Mevlevi Order that blend scholarship, music, and mysticism. It highlights the teachings of Mevlana Jalaluddin Rumi, a prominent 13th-century poet and philosopher. The museum also hosts Whirling Dervish performances, which showcase the mystical practices of the Mevlevi order.

== Whirling dervish performances ==
The museum offers Whirling Dervish performances, central to the Mevlevi tradition. These performances honor Rumi's teachings. Historically held every Sunday, the shows are performed in a hall that seats 150 people.

== Historical and cultural ==
According to Pierre Nora’s concept of "lieux de mémoire" from his essay "Between Memory and History: Les Lieux de Mémoire," the Galata Mevlevi Lodge represents a "site of memory" that captures various cultural and historical shifts. The lodge's origins and its association with Whirling Dervishes reflect a broader cultural evolution, from the influence of Rumi to the challenges posed by 20th-century anti-religious laws.
