= Ron Fricke =

American director and cinematographer

- Born: February 24, 1953 (age 73)
- Occupations: Film director, cinematographer
- Known for: Non-narrative feature films Baraka, Chronos, and Samsara

Ron Fricke (born February 24, 1953) is an American film director and cinematographer specializing in time-lapse and large-format cinematography, known for his non-narrative feature films.

== Early life ==
Fricke's father served in the United States military. His early years were in Germany, before returning to the United States at age 10. He was influenced by the films of David Lean, watching Lawrence of Arabia seven times. The dialogue-free closing sequence of Stanley Kubrick's 2001: A Space Odyssey was another major influence on the film-maker. He began studying and practicing photography in high school.

Fricke attended Southwestern Oklahoma State University in Weatherford, Oklahoma.

== Career ==
After college, Fricke moved to Santa Fe, New Mexico, and made a 16mm short film about a narrow-gauge railroad for the Narrow Gauge Railroad Preservation Association.

After serving as director of photography for Koyaanisqatsi (1982, directed by Godfrey Reggio), Fricke directed the IMAX films Chronos (1985) and Sacred Site (1986). He became attracted to the format after watching To Fly! in Washington, D.C., while working on Koyaanisqatsi.

He directed the purely cinematic non-verbal non-narrative Baraka (1992), designing his own 65 mm camera equipment for the feature, and earning broad critical acclaim. He also designed and constructed new time-lapse mechanisms to achieve camera movement while filming at a very slow frame-rate. Fricke worked with Mark Magidson as producer and Michael Stearns as the music composer, both of whom would work with him on future projects.

His film Samsara premiered at the Toronto International Film Festival in September 2011, then screened in the U.S. the following year. Fricke described the film as an evolution of his work: "Both technically and philosophically, I am ready to delve even deeper into my favorite theme: humanity's relationship to the eternal."

Fricke worked as a cinematographer for parts of the 2005 Star Wars film Revenge of the Sith, shooting the eruption of Mount Etna in Sicily for scenes of the volcanic planet Mustafar. He was also an early collaborator with Francis Ford Coppola on the director's multi-decade-long project, Megalopolis, in the 1980s.

== Filmography ==
Feature films

Year	Title	Director	Writer	Producer	Cinematographer	Editor
1982	Koyaanisqatsi	No	Yes	No	Yes	Yes
1992	Baraka	Yes	Yes	No	Yes	Yes
2011	Samsara	Yes	Yes	No	Yes	Yes

Short films

Year	Title	Director	Writer	Producer	Cinematographer	Editor
1985	Chronos	Yes	No	Yes	Yes	Yes
1986	Sacred Site	Yes	No	Yes	Yes	Yes
