= Mel Lawrence =

American film producer

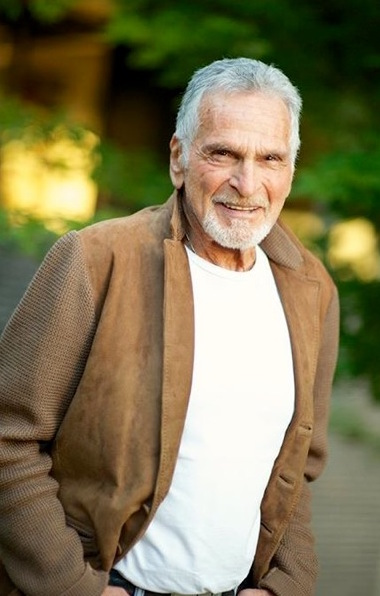
- Born: May 17, 1935; Brooklyn, New York
- Died: November 5, 2016 (aged 81)
- Occupations: Film director and producer
- Family: Brother: Andrew Lachs Nephew: Seth Lachs

Mel Lawrence (May 17, 1935 - November 5, 2016) was an American film director and producer and former concert and festival promoter. He is best known for his role as the Director of Operations at the Woodstock Festival, his work on the Qatsi Trilogy, and for directing and producing the Emmy-nominated documentary Paha Sapa: The Struggle for the Black Hills.

== Life and career ==
Mel Lawrence was born and raised in Brooklyn, New York. Lawrence attended Lafayette High School and worked at Coney Island on the beach and at Ebbets Field, where he sold ice cream and soda and watched the Dodgers. In 1954, at age 18, he was drafted into the Army and served 2 years in the 82nd Airborne, after which he attended Long Island University on the GI Bill, graduating with a BS in speech pathology. In 1960 he moved to Honolulu, Hawaii to pursue a master's degree at the University of Hawaii, but soon left to work at KPOI, the top rock radio station in the city, as the station's promotions director. In 1962, Lawrence became the Partner/Vice President of Arena Associates, Inc, a concert promotion company, where he produced over 50 major concerts in partnership with KPOI over the next five years.

In 1967, Lawrence became the Promotions director of KFRC, in San Francisco, CA, where he co-created and co-produced The Magic Mountain Music Festival and helped facilitate the Monterey Pop Festival after the success of Magic Mountain Music Festival. The Magic Mountain and Monterey Pop festivals were the country's first pop festivals ever produced and two of the seminal moments of the “Summer of Love.” Following the success of these festivals, Lawrence went on to co-produce the Miami Pop Festival in 1968 and then became the Director of Operations for the historic Woodstock Festival in 1969.

In 1970 Lawrence moved to New Mexico, where he became the Director of Development for the Wheelwright Museum of the Indian American, a museum dedicated to Native American art. He also continued to produce music festivals, including Jamboree in the Hills, a country music festival in Wheeling, West Virginia, that became an annual festival that is still held today.

In 1979 Lawrence turned his attention to documentary filmmaking when he became the Associate Producer of Koyaanisqatsi: Life Out of Balance, a 1982 film directed by Godfrey Reggio with music composed by Philip Glass and cinematography by Ron Fricke, which was presented by Francis Ford Coppola, then worked with Island/Alive to market and promote the film. In 1984 he became a producer for the sequel film, Powaqqatsi: Life in Transformation, traveling to 17 countries to scout locations and set up film crews. When the film was released he directed the film's marketing and distribution with the Santa Fe Institute for Regional Education (a non-profit production foundation).

In 1989, Lawrence worked in Brazil as a line producer for Ilé Aiyé, a PBS documentary about the Candomble religion of Brazil's West African Yoruba immigrants directed by David Byrne of Talking Heads and scouted locations in Brazil for the TBS documentary Without Borders, which focused on the future of the Amazon.

Following the success of this work, Lawrence went on to produce and direct a number of documentaries for HBO and TBS, including The Amazon Warrior (1996), a film about the Kayapo leader Paiakan and his work to save the Brazilian rainforest by stopping the building of a dam that would have flooded the Amazon; Biker Women (1996), about accomplished female motorcycle riders; and Legends of the Bushmen (1997), about Namibia's indigenous people, the Bushmen. Lawrence was also a partner at Deep River Productions, and the company's vice president.

Lawrence also executive produced Soul in the Hole (1997), a documentary about Brooklyn street basketball that was released theatrically and won the Independent Spirit: Truer Than Fiction Award.

Lawrence's best-known film is Paha Sapa: The Struggle for the Black Hills (1993), a documentary made for HBO that chronicles the 125-year land-claims conflict between the Lakota Sioux Nation and the U.S. government by combining on-location footage, archival photos and first-person accounts. The film was nominated for an Emmy and Lawrence won Best Director by the American Indian Film Festival as well as a number of other awards in 1994.

In 1997 Lawrence became Program Director for The Recovery Network, a start-up cable network designed specifically for addicts and their families and support community. Lawrence reprogrammed and produced over 100 hours of content for the network which was seen in over 15 million households in the U.S.

In 1999, Lawrence directed special events for Woodstock ’99, the music festival commemorating the thirtieth anniversary of the original Woodstock Festival. From 2001 to 2003 he returned to his work on the Qatsi Trilogy as a co-producer for Naqoyqatsi: Life as War, the last film in the series, which was presented by Steven Soderbergh and distributed by Miramax.

In 2004, he co-produced Un Retrato de Diego, a documentary about Mexican artist Diego Rivera made by his grandson.

From 2008-2011 Lawrence worked as a story producer on several Discovery Channel series, including Iditarod, and the Emmy-winning Deadliest Catch, and on NBC’s Shark U, and TruTV’s Black Gold, and in 2012 he worked as the consulting producer of the film Visitors, another film written and directed by Godfrey Reggio and scored by Philip Glass.

When Lawrence died he was working on a number of documentaries, including a film about tequila (tentatively titled The Ambassador of Tequila), a work chronicling the stories of multiple generations of a Chinese-American family known as Bamboo Roots, and an update on the conflicts covered in his film Paha Sapa.

He is survived by his partner, the artist Nani Grenell and his beloved nephew Seth Lachs.

== Music Festivals ==
Year(s)	Festival	Role
1967-78	Magic Mountain Music Festival	Co-Producer
1967	Monterey Pop Festival	Operations
1968	Miami Pop Festival	Co-Producer
1968	Newport Pop Festival	Producer
1969	Woodstock Festival	Director of Operations
1976-9	Jamboree in The Hills	Producer
1999	Woodstock ’99	Director Special Events

== Filmography ==
Year	Title	Credit	Production/Distribution
1982	Koyaanisqatsi	Associate Producer	Island Alive
1987	Powaqqatsi: Life in Transformation	Producer	Cannon
1988	Without Borders	Associate Producer	TBS
1989	Île Aye	Line Producer	PBS
1994	Paha Sapa - The Struggle for the Black Hills	Producer/Director	HBO
1995	Biker Women	Producer	TBS
1996	The Amazon Warrior	Producer/Director	TBS
1997	Legends of the Bushmen	Executive Producer	
1997	Soul in the Hole	Executive Producer	HBO
2002	Naqoyqatsi: Life as War	Co-producer	Miramax
2005	Un Retrato De Diego	Producer	
2013	The Ambassador of Tequila	Producer	Baseline Productions
2013	Visitors	Consulting Producer	Cinedigm

== Television work ==
- Recovery Network (1997-2000) (Producer, Program Director)
- Iditarod (Original Productions) (2008) (story producer)
- Shark U (Original Productions) (2008) (story producer)
- Deadliest Catch (Original Productions) (2008 - 2010) (story producer)
- Black Gold (Original Productions)(2011-2012) (story producer)

== Awards ==
1994	Paha Sapa: The Struggle for the Black Hills	Emmy (News & Documentary)	Best Documentary Program	Nomination
1994	Paha Sapa: The Struggle for the Black Hills	American Indian Film Festival	Best Director	Win
1994	Paha Sapa: The Struggle for the Black Hills	San Francisco Film Festival	Golden Gate Award	Win
1994	Paha Sapa: The Struggle for the Black Hills	Cine Golden Eagle Award	Golden Eagle Award	Win
1994	Paha Sapa: The Struggle for the Black Hills	National Education Film Festival	Golden Apple Award	Win
1997	Soul in the Hole	Independent Spirit Awards	Truer Than Fiction Award	Win
