= Anima Mundi (film) =

1991 Italian–American documentary

- Directed by: Godfrey Reggio
- Written by: Godfrey Reggio
- Produced by: Steve Goldin; Rory Johnston
- Cinematography: Graham Berry
- Edited by: Miroslav Janek
- Music by: Philip Glass
- Release date: April 20, 1991
- Running time: 28 minutes
- Countries: United States; Italy
- Language: None

Anima Mundi (also known as The Soul of the World) is a 1991 Italian-American short documentary film directed by Godfrey Reggio. The film focuses on the world of nature and wildlife, particularly jungles, sealife, and insects.

== Production ==
Anima Mundi was commissioned by Italian jewellers Bulgari for use by the World Wide Fund for Nature in their Biological Diversity Program.

== Music ==
The film was scored by Philip Glass, who also worked with Reggio on Koyaanisqatsi (1983), Powaqqatsi (1988), and, later, on Naqoyqatsi (2002). Anima Mundi features many of the techniques from the Qatsi trilogy, but it is not considered to be directly related to the series. Two tracks from the soundtrack, "Living Waters" and "The Beginning," appeared on the soundtrack to the 1998 film The Truman Show.

== Home media ==
Anima Mundi was released on the Criterion Collection alongside the Qatsi trilogy on December 11, 2012.
