= Serra Pelada (meteorite) =

Meteorite found in Brazil

- Class: Eucrite
- Parent body: (4) Vesta
- Shock stage: Moderate
- Weathering grade: W0
- Country: Brazil
- Region: Pará
- Coordinates: 05°57′08″S 49°39′14″W
- Observed fall: Yes
- Fall date: June 19, 2017
- Found date: June 19, 2017
- TKW: 12 kg
- Strewn field: no

Serra Pelada meteorite is a meteorite found in Curionópolis, in the state of the Pará, Brazil. Its fall was observed on June 29, 2017, by people in Eldorado dos Carajás, Marabá and Parauapebas. Many students and a lookout, Manuel da Silva, of the Escola Rita Lima de Souza, heard a series of four to 6 detonations and a few minutes later witnessed a rock falling on the road near the school.

== Overview ==
Studies by researchers from Bahia, Pará, Rio de Janeiro and São Paulo indicated that it was a rare type of meteorite, which must have come off one of the largest and brightest asteroids in the Solar System, 4 Vesta. The meteorite of 12 kilograms (26 lb) is essentially a basaltic rock, consisting mainly of two minerals, feldspar and silicates, known as pyroxenes, in addition to quartz and apatite, in smaller proportions.

== See also ==
- Glossary of meteoritics
- Serra Pelada
