= Hale County This Morning, This Evening =

2018 documentary film by RaMell Ross

- Film poster
- Directed by: RaMell Ross
- Written by: RaMell Ross; Maya Krinsky
- Produced by: RaMell Ross; Joslyn Barnes; Su Kim
- Starring: Latrenda "Boosie" Ash; Quincy Bryant; Daniel Collins
- Edited by: RaMell Ross; Joslyn Barnes; Maya Krinsky; Robb Moss
- Music by: Scott Alario; Forest Kelley; Alex Somers
- Distributed by: The Cinema Guild
- Release dates: January 19, 2018 (Sundance Film Festival); September 14, 2018 (United States)
- Running time: 76 minutes
- Country: United States
- Language: English
- Box office: $112,300

Hale County This Morning, This Evening is a 2018 American documentary film about the lives of African Americans in Hale County, Alabama. It is directed by RaMell Ross and produced by RaMell Ross, Joslyn Barnes, Su Kim, and is Ross's first nonfiction feature. The documentary is the winner of 2018 Sundance Film Festival award for U.S. Documentary Special Jury Award for Creative Vision, 2018 Gotham Independent Film Award for Best Documentary Feature and the Cinema Eye Honors Outstanding Achievement in Nonfiction Feature Filmmaking. It was nominated for the Academy Award for Best Documentary Feature. It was released in theaters on September 14, 2018, later aired on television as part of the PBS series Independent Lens, and eventually won a 2020 Peabody Award.

== Summary ==
Lacking a linear storyline, Hale County This Morning, This Evening follows various inhabitants of Hale County in Alabama's Black Belt. Questions posited throughout as intertitles loosely structure the film. They are: “What is the orbit of our dreaming?”, “How do we not frame someone?” and “Whose child is this?” Ross shared a list in Filmmaker of nonhierarchical aims and corresponding strategies to shape the film's avant-garde form including "to centralize my new community in documentary's language of truth" and then to "participate, not capture; shoot from not at" the community. The result is a non-fiction work that has the qualities of a visual orchestra, the 76 minute film following "the flow of five musical movements, as (Quincy) Bryant and (Daniel) Collins float in and out of frame, their lives progressing through college and fatherhood" Important to Ross's imagery in the film and his art practice is what he calls the epic-banal, "the magnificence of the universe’s encasement in the social, awaiting other forms," which he says is "the direct result of looking at photography and film in the context of representation and lack of representation . . . its tendency to sensationalize." The epic-banal is "an epic moment in something incredibly simple" that something can be profound, grandiose and deeply meaningful in the simple depictions of existence of Black people.

RaMell Ross said of the movie: "If we weren't stuck in our first-person points of view, I would argue that most problems in the world that have to do with inequality would be solved, because we wouldn't be stuck in our single points of views."

== Critical reception ==
Hale County This Morning, This Evening received critical acclaim, with a 97% rating on Rotten Tomatoes based on 69 reviews, and an average rating of 8.4/10; the website's consensus states "Intimate in scope yet thematically expansive, Hale County This Morning, This Evening draws extraordinary insights out of seemingly ordinary moments." It scores 85 on Metacritic, indicating "universal acclaim". The Village Voice's Bilge Ebiri wrote "It’s not every day that you witness a new cinematic language being born, but watching RaMell Ross’s evocatively titled documentary Hale County This Morning, This Evening qualifies".

Glenn Kenny of The New York Times lauded Ross's "patient and focused eye. His camera’s gaze has a quality of reserve, one that insistently imparts respect to his subjects." Peter Bradshaw of The Guardian gave the film a full five stars and labelled it "visionary," while Owen Gleiberman of Variety called it a "transcendental scrapbook". Its racial politics were commended by Melissa Vincent of The Globe and Mail, stating "At every juncture, Ross elects for ambiguity and poses a question to the viewer to answer how black bodies are viewed, encouraging the audience to perform the labour of challenging their expectations." At The Atlantic Samantha N. Sheppard writes "Ross shows how cinema can do more than just relay a narrative", placing the film in camp with the work of the Black Independent Movement member's Charles Burnett, Haile Gerima and Julie Dash as he "upends cinematic conventions, and in doing so, he shows blackness in a way that is rarely seen on-screen"

Following the 91st Academy Awards nominations, Jason Parham of Wired argued Hale County This Morning, This Evening's inclusion for Best Documentary Feature signaled a "new age of documentary" in which "academy voters must now embrace their changing future."

== Accolades ==
- AFI Docs 2018
- Champs-Élysées Film Festival 2018
- Sheffield Doc/Fest 2018
- Bildrausch Film Festival Basel 2018 - Special Mention International Competition 2018
- Documental Ambulante 2018
- Dok.fest International Documentary Film Festival Munich 2018
- Sarasota Film Festival 2018
- Montclair Film Festival 2018 - Winner Best Documentary Bruce Sinofsky Prize
- San Francisco Film Festival 2018
- New Directors/New Films 2018
- Full Frame Documentary Film Festival 2018 - Winner Grand Jury Prize
- CPH:DOX 2018
- True/False Film Fest 2018
- Unorthodocs Film Festival 2018
- Sundance Film Festival 2018 - Winner U.S. Documentary Special Jury Award for Creative Vision
- Independent Spirit Awards 2019 - Best Documentary Feature nominee
- Nominated for Best Documentary Feature at the 91st Academy Awards
- Peabody Award 2019

== See also ==
- List of black films of the 2010s
- Hale County, Alabama
- Godfrey Reggio- whose Qatsi trilogy documentaries were the inspiration for this film
