= Jon Kane =

American film director

- Born: 1962 (age 63–64); Bryn Mawr, Pennsylvania
- Occupations: Director, Editor

Jon Kane is an American film editor, director, and DJ based in Red Hook, Brooklyn, New York.

== Career ==
Kane was the editor of Naqoyqatsi, the third film in the Qatsi trilogy directed by Godfrey Reggio and scored by Philip Glass.

Kane has also done notable work as a commercial director and editor. The New York Times has described his style as "psychedelic." In the early years of MTV, he filmed and edited the original show open to The Real World and worked on the "Moon Man" campaign. His series of branding spots for the VH1 Behind the Music campaign were famously parodied by Saturday Night Live. Kane has been nominated for a Clio Award and a spot he created for Time Warner was included in the MoMA's Department of Cinema collection. He is quoted as saying "In commercials, where you only have 30 seconds to create a world, music and pictures cut deeper and faster than words."

In addition to his commercial work, Kane has edited and directed several short films and been active as a house music DJ and music video director since the early 1980s. In addition to touring as the DJ for Fischerspooner he also edited and directed several of the band's music videos.

At present, Kane is the founder, owner and lead editor/director at opticnerve™. He edited and co-directed another Godfrey Reggio film, Once Within a Time.

== Filmography as director ==
- Cartoon Lost and Found (1989)
- Time Warner – The world is our audience. (1990)
- Oh Yeah! Cartoons (S01E12, segment "Oh Yeah! Wraparounds") (1998)
- It's Only Rock 'n' Roll (2000)
- Once Within a Time (2022)
