= Visitors (2013 film) =

2013 film

- Film poster
- Directed by: Godfrey Reggio
- Written by: Godfrey Reggio
- Produced by: Craig Aspen; Mara Campione; Phoebe Greenberg; Jon Kane; Penny Mancuso; Godfrey Reggio; Lawrence Taub
- Cinematography: Graham Berry; Trish Govoni; Tom Lowe
- Edited by: Chris Besecker; Jon Kane
- Music by: Philip Glass
- Production companies: Institute for Regional Education; Opticnerve; Noyes Films; PHI Films
- Distributed by: Cinedigm
- Release dates: September 8, 2013 (TIFF); January 2014 (US)
- Running time: 87 minutes
- Country: United States
- Language: No dialogue
- Budget: $4.6 million

Visitors is a 2013 American documentary film, written and directed by Godfrey Reggio.

== Summary ==
It explores (like his previous films) "humanity's trancelike relationship with technology."

== Music ==
The musical score for Visitors was composed by Philip Glass, who previously collaborated with director Godfrey Reggio on the Qatsi trilogy. Performed by the Bruckner Orchestra Linz and conducted by Dennis Russell Davies, the music was released as a soundtrack album by Orange Mountain Music on September 3, 2013.

== Release ==
It was screened in the Special Presentation section at the 2013 Toronto International Film Festival.

== Reception ==
On the review aggregator website Rotten Tomatoes, 69% of 55 critics' reviews are positive, with an average rating of 6.2/10. The website's consensus reads: "While director Godfrey Reggio's filmmaking style has lost some of its initial thrill, Visitors finds him returning to his familiar milieu with customary élan." Metacritic, which uses a weighted average, assigned the film a score of 62 out of 100, based on 20 critics, indicating "generally favorable" reviews.
