= Serra Pelada =

Brazilian village

Serra Pelada Mine
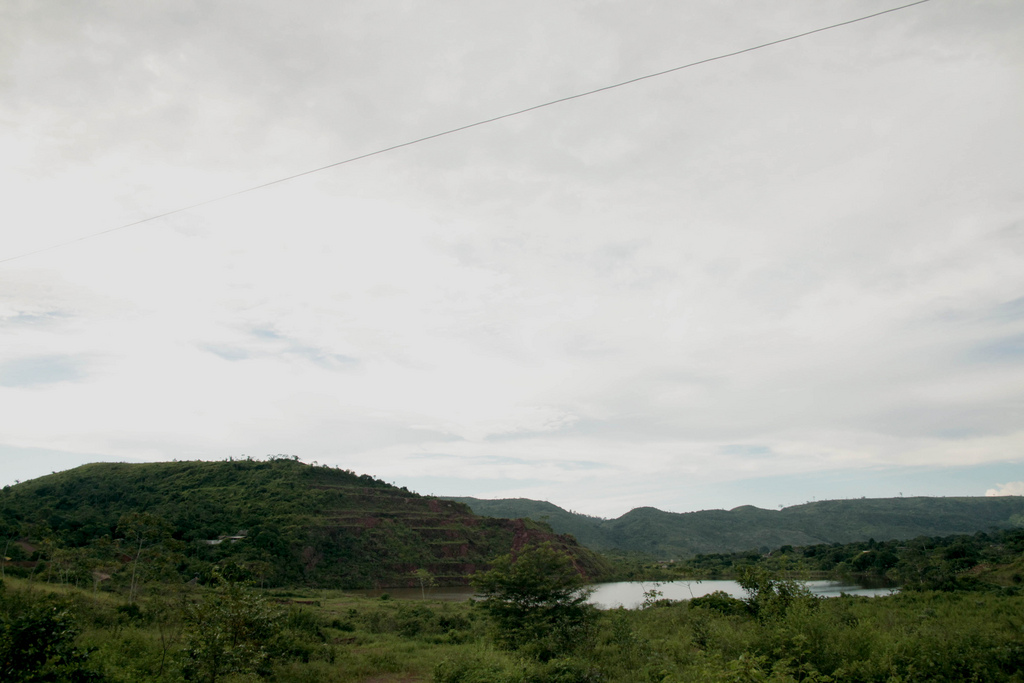
- The former pit of Serra Pelada now forms a lake

- Location in Brazil
- Location: Pará, Brazil; 5°56′39″S 49°39′53″W
- Products: Gold
- Production: Official records: 44.5 tons Black market estimate: 360 tons
- Opened: 1980
- Closed: 1986

Serra Pelada (English: "Bald Ridge") is a Brazilian village and district of the Municipality of Curionópolis, in the southeast of Pará State. A former boomtown, it is best known for its open-pit mine, which operated from 1980 until the early 90s and is now a polluted lake.

Serra Pelada lies 430 kilometres (270 mi) south of the mouth of the Amazon River, and was rainforest until its initial settlement in the late 1970s. Its mine was made infamous by the still images taken by Alfredo Jaar and later by Sebastião Salgado and the first section of Godfrey Reggio's 1988 documentary Powaqqatsi, showing an anthill of workers moving vast amounts of ore by hand. Because of the chaotic nature of the operation estimating the number of miners was difficult, but at least 100,000 people were thought to be present, making it one of the largest mines in the world. Today the Serra Pelada mine is abandoned and the giant open pit that was created by hand has filled with water, creating a small polluted lake. However, mining operations in the area, particularly for hematite, have continued.

== Municipal governance ==
The precise administrative status of Serra Pelada, a village of about 6,000 inhabitants, is unclear. As early as 1996, Serra Pelada was referred to as a district in its own right by the Chamber of Deputies. Documents of the city of Curionópolis and state of Pará have also referred to Serra Pelada as a district. However, Curionópolis City Council, the only body with jurisdiction, has never produced official legislation establishing Serra Pelada as a district.

== History ==
Prior to settlement in the late 70s, the area was covered in rainforest. The history of Serra Pelada is defined by artisanal mining. Rural settlement started in 1978, shortly prior to the discovery of gold. While the first settlers were not miners by trade, their settlement was sponsored by a scheme of the Ministry of Mines and Energy, the "Garimpo Project", which aimed to expand Brazil's production of gemstones and precious metals.

=== Discovery and growth ===
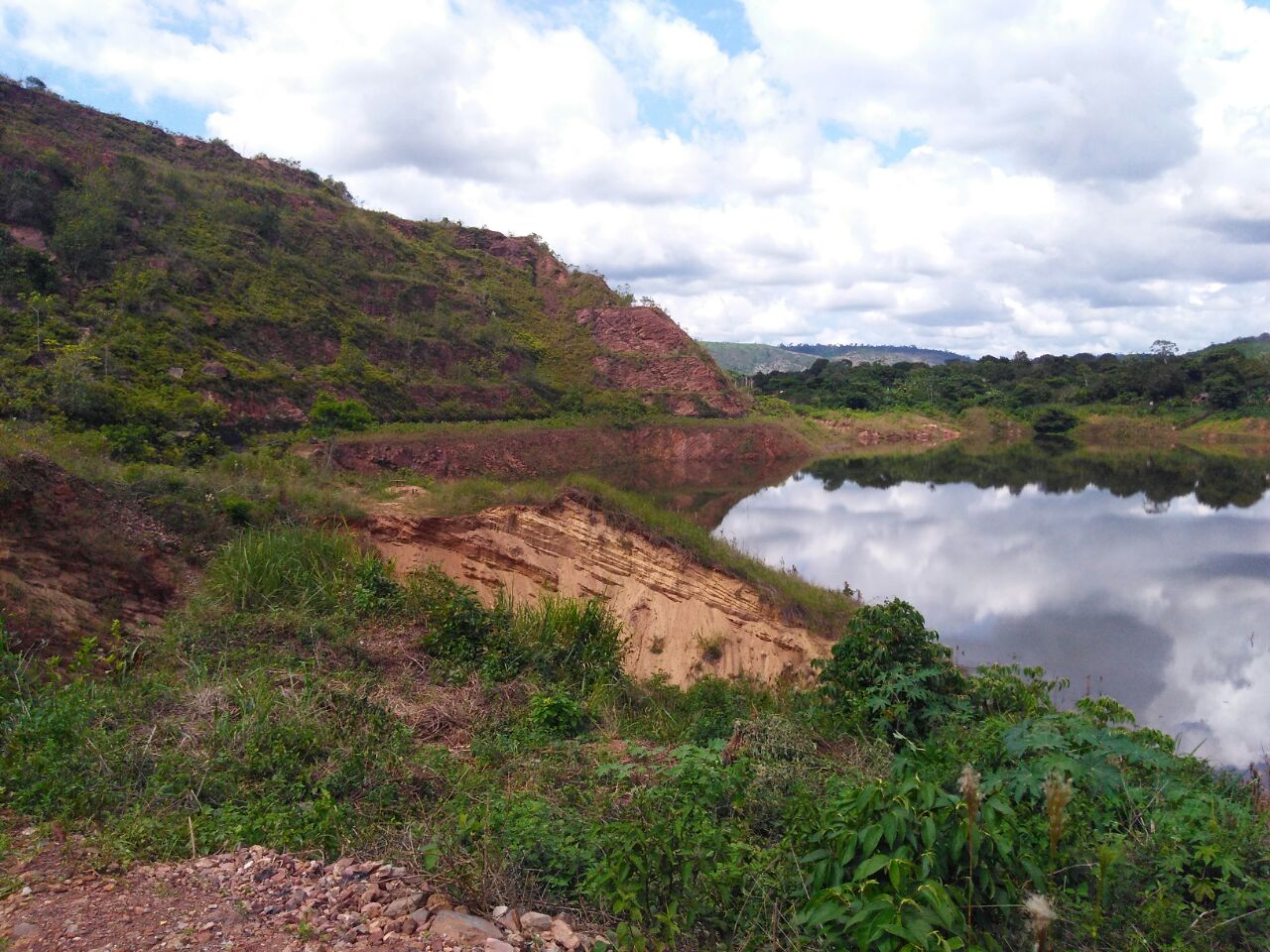
Pit on the site of Serra Pelada hill, with adjacent rubble hill.

According to legend, the first alluvial gold at the Serra Pelada site was found in December 1979 by a vaqueiro in the Grota Rica stream, on the Três Barras Farm owned by Genésio Ferreira da Silva. In January 1980, Silva hired a geologist to investigate whether gold he found on his property was part of a larger deposit. A local child swimming on the banks of a local river found a 6-gram (0.21 oz) nugget of gold. Soon word leaked out that Genésio Silva was indeed sitting upon one of the largest deposits in the world. By the end of the week a gold rush had started with thousands of people descending upon the farm to mine. Five weeks later, there were 10,000 on Silva's property and another 12,000 nearby. Huge nuggets were quickly discovered, the biggest weighing nearly 6.8 kilograms (15 lb) and worth $108,000 in 1980 ($422,011 in 2025). By March, the prospectors (garimpeiros) had formed a village, named Serra Pelada after the "bald mountain" where gold was mined after the Grota Rica stream was exhausted.

At first the only way to get to the remote site was by plane or foot. Garimpeiros would often pay exorbitant prices to have taxis drive them from the nearest town to the end of a dirt track; from there, they would walk the remaining distance—some 15 kilometres (9 mi)—to the site. The growing town, since it could only be made of material that was carried in by hand, was a collection of haphazard shacks and tents. Each prospector had a 2 metres (6 ft 7 in) by 3 metres (9.8 ft) claim. By May 1980 there were 4,000 such claims. The mine was an open pit, and hand-mined by prospectors. While most would never see great wealth from their labors, some poor prospectors became millionaires overnight. Genésio Ferreira da Silva made a fortune from requiring 10% of all revenue produced by the prospectors until the arrival of the government.

=== Government administration ===
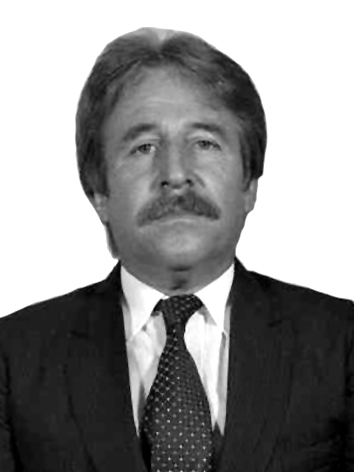
Sebastião Curió served as Federal Comptroller from 1980 to 1982, and was subsequently elected as a federal deputy for Pará. He would continue to exercise power over the area until 2008 through COOMIGASP and as Mayor of Curionópolis.

The arrival of the prospectors spurred a government response. In March, Rio Doce Geology and Mining (DOCEGEO), a subsidiary of the state-owned Companhia Vale do Rio Doce, established itself as the monopoly buyer of gold mined on the site, and took responsibility for maintaining mine infrastructure in 1980. In May, the National Intelligence Service arrived, bringing with it the Federal Revenue Department, the Federal Savings Bank, Correios, the Federal Police, and other agencies. By the summer of 1980, 30,000 prospectors were resident at the site, many of them badly exploited by the mine owners, who were charging hugely inflated prices for basic goods (such as water, which cost $3 a litre ($11.72 in 2025). The chaotic situation at the mine motivated the military government of João Figueiredo to appoint Major Sebastião Rodrigues de Moura (a.k.a. Sebastião Curió) as overseer of the operation, with the title of Interventor Federal (Federal Comptroller). In late 1980, the Diocese of Marabá established a parish and hospital in the growing village.

The operation of the mine was artisanal, i.e. hand-dug, until 1989. Ore and dirt was dug by shovel and deposited into sacks of up to 60 kilograms (130 lb), which were then manually carried up steep ramps and, later, as the mine deepened, ladders. The ore and dirt was scrubbed, refined, and searched in primitive gold-panning pools at the edge of the pit, and debris was deposited nearby. Sebastião Salgado's 1986 photographs of the mine recount that successful miners were entitled to wear striped shirts if they found a lode. The mine was patrolled by armed soldiers to prevent smuggling and clashes between prospectors.

Upon arrival, Curió immediately banned the presence of women, gambling and alcohol at and around the mine. The nearby town of Trinta provided space for women and banned activities. Thousands of women and underage girls engaged in prostitution in exchange for gold. Around 60–80 unsolved murders occurred in the town every month. Curió, a veteran of the Araguaia Counterinsurgency (rumored to have personally executed communist leader Mauricio Grabois), organized a paramilitary force, the"bate-paus", to enforce his rule in the area. Curió became a revered and feared figure among the miners, nicknamed "Doctor" and "Emperor of the Amazon". Despite wielding exceptional power over the mining area, Curió was seen rarely, allegedly refusing to step foot on the mine at the height of its activity and preferring to be flown over the site. Trinta would later be named Curionópolis in his honor; he is still fondly remembered by some for having brought order to the chaotic and violent boomtown.

By early 1981, surface deposits on Serra Pelada hill were exhausted, necessitating DOCEGEO to expand mining infrastructure and separate operations at the site into 11 sections (Igrejinha, Bucetinha, Serra Velha, Babilônia I, Babilônia II, Boca da Grota Rica, Terra Preta, Serrinha, PPO, Bico de Papagaio and Buraco da Viúva).

Between 1982 and 1983, DOCEGEO began to wind down its prospecting at Serra Pelada, and planned to close the mine on November 13, 1983. Major Curió, in the meantime elected a federal deputy for the Democratic Social Party for Pará, collaborated with the Miners' Union in order to ensure the mine remained open. 1983 was the mine's most productive year, with an official record of 17 tons mined.

=== Decline and St. Boniface Massacre ===
In 1984, the area of Serra Pelada reached its peak population of 80,000 (the municipality of Marabá, by comparison, had a total population of 60,000 in 1980). However, in the same year, production plummeted to 3.9 tons, and the pit reached a depth of 200 meters, making the sort of manual mining practiced at Serra Pelada increasingly difficult. Miners at the site were becoming restless, causing worries of unrest should the mine close. In the same year, DOCEGEO withdrew from the mine, leaving administration to the National Department of Mineral Production (DNPM); however, in 1985, the fall of the military dictatorship caused the DNPM to withdraw, citing the safety of its employees. Thereafter, administration of the mine and its surrounding villages fell to the Serra Pelada Miners' Mining Cooperative (COOMIGASP), an organization dominated by Deputy Curió and wracked with allegations of corruption, power struggles, and high debt.

In 1986, during the waning years of artisanal mining at Serra Pelada, Sebastião Salgado visited the mine to photograph for his Workers series, which aimed to document manual labor around the globe. While Salgado was hardly the first photographer or photojournalist to visit the mine, most previous photographers had shot in color and only visited for a day, whereas Salgado stayed on site for four weeks and shot in black-and-white. Images from the series were first published in the Sunday Times Magazine. They went on to be some of Salgado's most famous, and were published several times in their own dedicated book by Taschen.

In December 1987, a delegation of Serra Pelada residents traveled to Marabá to advocate for the resumption of mining activities and better living and working conditions. When their demands were not met, a group of the protestors, led by Jane Resende, blocked the Marabá Mixed Bridge, a section of the BR-155 highway which also carries foot and rail traffic, on December 29. Then-Governor Hélio Gueiros ordered the 4th Military Police Battalion to clear the bridge, with the assistance of 500 soldiers of the Brazilian Army. The soldiers cornered the protesters and opened fire on them for fifteen minutes. Official government estimates of the death toll were initially 2, which was later amended to 9. However, 79 miners went missing in the aftermath of what would later be deemed the St. Boniface Massacre (in commemoration of a local feast celebrating the saint on that day, and Boniface's unifying mission, seen as inspiration for the miners) or Bridge Massacre.

=== History since 1987 ===
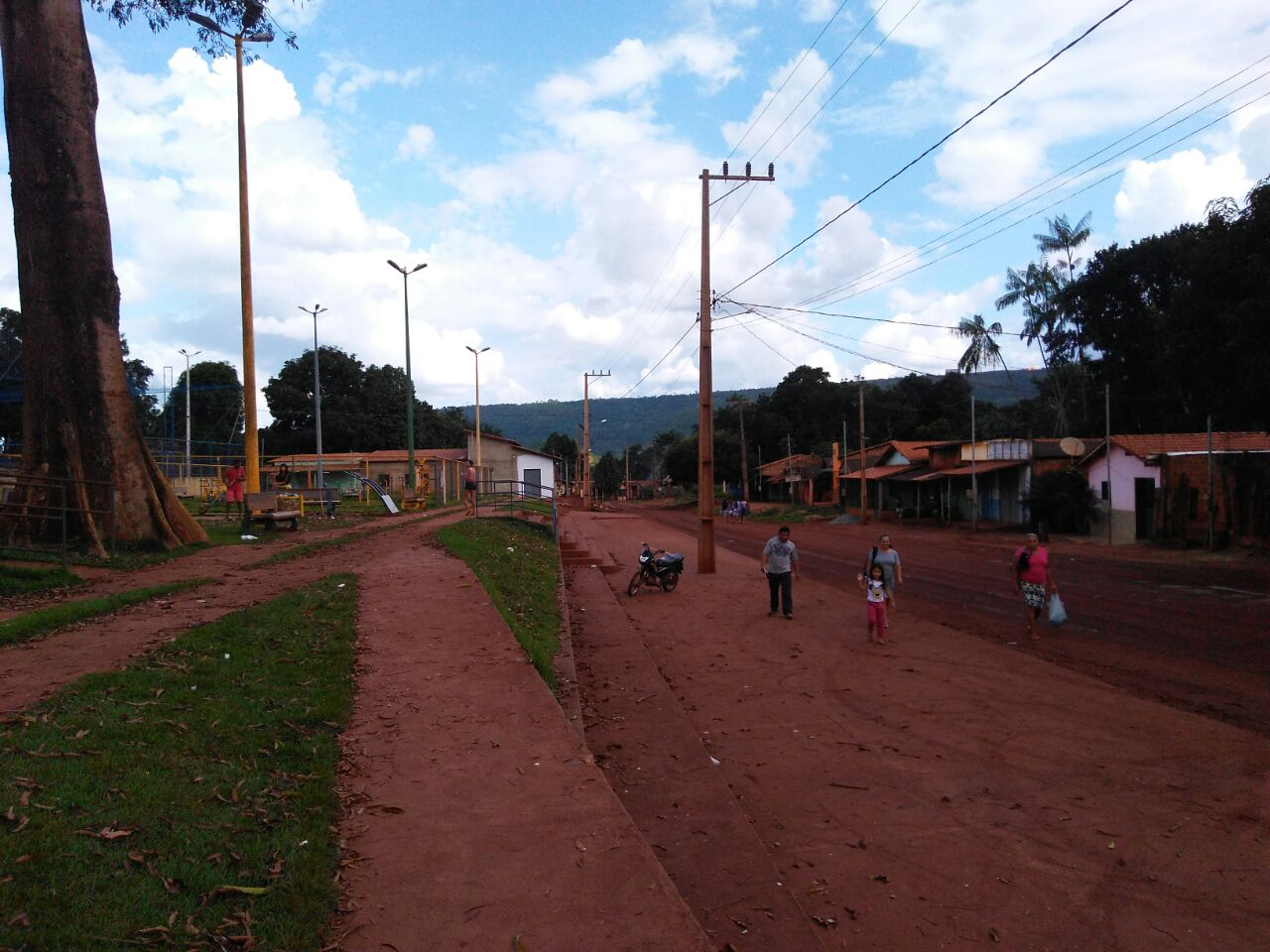
Street in Serra Pelada

In 1988, activists managed to establish municipal independence for Serra Pelada, which was until then under Marabá Municipality, under the municipality of Curionópolis. The diminishing mine was also shot in 1988 by Godfrey Reggio for Powaqqatsi. The 1990s began with renewed hope at the mine, as President Fernando Collor issued a decree extending mining activities at the site on June 12, 1991. However, this was short-lived, as Collor had the mine closed again in 1992, citing deadly landslides (although some miners accused Collor of yielding to pressure from multinational mining concerns). The pit quickly filled with water afterwards. In 1996, miners again agitated for the resuming of mining activities in the Serra Pelada area, leading to disturbances which resulted in a brief occupation by the Pará Military Police.

In 2002, approximately 10,000 people moved to Serra Pelada in reaction to the legalization of mining near the site. This resulted in renewed violence and conflict, including the murder of Antônio Clênio Cunha Lemos, president of the Curionópolis Miners' Union. Lemos himself was under investigation for the deaths of miners two years earlier. In 2004, an American company, Phoenix Gems do Brasil, announced that it had reached an agreement with COOMIGASP and Vale S.A. to mine the site. It sold its stake to the Canadian Colossus Minerals Inc., which indicated interest in restarting gold mining, in 2007. Colossus founded a joint venture, Serra Pelada Companhia de Desenvolvimento Mineral (SPCDM), with COOMIGASP.

Upon the announcement of Colossus's interest in restarting gold mining, the population of the village once again boomed. Between 2007 and 2012, infrastructure, including a new mineshaft to access underground deposits, a modern water distribution system, and new phone lines were built by Colossus in anticipation of Serra Pelada's reopening. However, in 2012, both parties in the joint venture were accused of serious corruption, in part due to their refusal to pay dividends to some 20,000 miners. Colossus declared bankruptcy in Canada in 2013, and SPCDM was investigated for embezzlement, tax evasion, and gold smuggling. The mine was again closed in 2014. The new mining site has also begun to fill with water.

In the early 2000s, Vale S.A. began exploring for hematite about 4 kilometers from the village. Implementation ran from 2006 to 2010. By 2017, it had become one of Vale's largest operations in northern Brazil, employing numerous miners in Serra Pelada.

== Environmental damage ==
Because of the use of mercury in the gold extraction process, large areas around the mine are considered dangerously contaminated. People eating fish downstream from the mine have elevated mercury levels. Serra Pelada hill, the namesake of the village, was completely destroyed and, in fact, inverted by mining by the early 1980s, although a parallel hill of mining debris now sits next to its original site, believed to contain valuable gold tailings.

== In popular media ==
- Brazilian comedy group Os Trapalhões made in 1982 Os Trapalhões na Serra Pelada, where four friends try to strike it rich at the Serra Pelada mine.
- A documentary video "Gold Lust" created by Neil Hollander in 1984, aired by WNET and narrated by Orson Welles.
- Powaqqatsi, a 1988 documentary film, opens with footage of Serra Pelada
- Baraka, a 1992 documentary film, additionally contains footage of Serra Pelada
- The Rundown, a 2003 American comedy film, occurs at a fictional mine with many elements based on the Serra Pelada.
- Serra Pelada, 2013 Brazilian action film
- The Salt of the Earth, a 2014 documentary film about Brazilian photographer Sebastião Salgado, whose most iconic works featured the miners of Serra Pelada

== Bibliography ==
=== References ===
- Eakin, Marshall C. (1998). Brazil: The Once and Future Country. Palgrave Macmillan. ISBN 0-312-21445-6. 320 pp.
- Negus, George (September 26, 2007). "Treasure of Serra Pelada". 60 Minutes. AU: Nine MSN. Archived from the original on January 3, 2010.
- "Brazil: The Treasure of Serra Pelada". Time. Sep 8, 1980. Archived from the original on May 13, 2008.
- Waszkis, Helmut (1993). Mining in the Americas: stories and history. Woodhead Publishing. ISBN 1-85573-131-2. 280 pp.
- Watras, Carl J.; Huckabee, John W. (1994). Mercury pollution: integration and synthesis. CRC Press. ISBN 1-56670-066-3. 727 pp.
- Wright, Angus Lindsay; Wolford, Wendy (2003). To inherit the earth: the landless movement and the struggle for a new Brazil. Food First Books. ISBN 0-935028-90-0. 368 pp.
