= Miami Pop Festival (December 1968) =

Rock festival

Coordinates: 25.978474°N 80.13799°W

- Poster/ad for Miami Pop Festival with scheduled performers
- Genre: Pop music, rock music
- Dates: December 28–30, 1968
- Locations: Gulfstream Park in Hallandale, Florida
- Years active: 1968
- Founders: Tom Rounds, Mel Lawrence and others
- Attendance: 100,000

The Miami Pop Festival was a rock festival that took place from December 28-30, 1968, at Gulfstream Park, a horse racing track in Hallandale, Florida, just north of Miami. It is sometimes confused with a separate event that took place seven months earlier, at the same venue, though the two events were unrelated. The earlier event was officially publicized on promotional materials and in radio ads as the "1968 Pop and Underground Festival," and "The 1968 Pop Festival," but later came to be referred to colloquially as the "Miami" Pop Festival, a practice which has led to confusion between the two events.

== History ==
The Miami Pop Festival was the first major rock festival on America's east coast. It was produced by a team led by Tom Rounds and Mel Lawrence, who had previously produced the seminal KFRC Fantasy Fair and Magic Mountain Music Festival on Mount Tamalpais in Marin County, California. The crowd size for the three days was estimated to be around 100,000.

Performers covered a wide range of music genres, and included:

- The Amboy Dukes
- Chuck Berry
- Blues Image
- The Box Tops
- Paul Butterfield Blues Band
- Canned Heat
- Wayne Cochran
- Cosmic Drum (aka Train of Thought)
- James Cotton Blues Band
- Country Joe and the Fish
- José Feliciano
- Fish Ray
- Flatt and Scruggs
- Fleetwood Mac
- Marvin Gaye
- The Grass Roots
- Grateful Dead
- Richie Havens
- Ian & Sylvia
- Iron Butterfly
- Junior Junkanoos
- Jr. Walker & The Allstars
- The Charles Lloyd Quartet
- Hugh Masekela
- Joni Mitchell
- Pacific Gas & Electric
- Procol Harum
- Terry Reid
- Buffy Sainte-Marie
- Steppenwolf
- The Sweet Inspirations
- Sweetwater
- Joe Tex
- Three Dog Night
- The Turtles

Many of these musicians were cast as superheroes in a commemorative comic book distributed at the event. Interesting moments during the festival included: Joni Mitchell inviting former Hollies member and new love interest Graham Nash, as well as Richie Havens to join her onstage to sing Dino Valenti's "Get Together"; Jefferson Airplane's Jack Casady playing bass guitar with Country Joe & the Fish; and folksinger/songwriter icon and Coconut Grove resident Fred Neil stopping in at the festival one day to hang out and enjoy the music. Several acts advertised in early promotional materials did not appear, and their names were removed from subsequent promotions, including John Mayall's Bluesbreakers, Dino Valenti and H.P. Lovecraft. Two bands who were expected to appear were unable to perform due to last-minute problems: The McCoys got snowbound in Canada and Booker T. Jones of Booker T. & the M.G.'s got the flu.

This festival was unique in that it was the first rock festival to have two entirely separate 'main' stages several hundred yards apart (the Flower Stage and the Flying Stage), both operating simultaneously and offering performers of equal calibre.

== See also ==
- List of historic rock festivals
