= Iris Cahn =

Iris Cahn is an American film editor and educator. She is a full professor and, for over twenty years, chaired the Film Conservatory at SUNY Purchase College in Purchase, New York.

== Early life and education ==
Cahn earned a Bachelor of Fine Arts degree from SUNY Purchase College and a Master of Arts degree from New York University.

== Career ==
Cahn has edited feature films and documentary projects including Powaqqatsi (directed by Godfrey Reggio, with music by Philip Glass), Worst Possible Illusion: The Curiosity Cabinet of Vik Muniz (for which she also received writing credit), Fragments of Kubelka, Lessons from an American Primary (which she also produced), and Devo: Are We Not Men?. She was supervising editor on Ornette: Made in America (directed by Shirley Clarke) and created short films that screened at the New York Film Festival and on U.S. network television.

Her work has been presented at the Cannes, Sundance, and Berlin festivals, as well as at Lincoln Center and the Robert Flaherty Film Seminar. Cahn has received two Emmy Award nominations for specials and a television series.

== Academic work ==
At Purchase College, Cahn taught film editing and production, serving as Chair of the Film Conservatory for more than two decades. Her teaching emphasized documentary storytelling, visual rhythm, and collaboration between editors and directors.

== Filmography ==
- Powaqqatsi – Editor
- Worst Possible Illusion: The Curiosity Cabinet of Vik Muniz – Editor, Writer
- Fragments of Kubelka – Editor
- Lessons from an American Primary – Producer, Editor
- Devo: Are We Not Men? – Editor
- Ornette: Made in America – Supervising Editor
