= Once Within a Time =

2023 film by Godfrey Reggio

- Film poster
- Directed by: Godfrey Reggio; Jon Kane
- Written by: Godfrey Reggio
- Produced by: Godfrey Reggio; Mara Campione
- Starring: Mike Tyson; Aaron Kingsley Adetola; Sussan Deyhim
- Cinematography: Trish Govoni
- Edited by: Jon Kane
- Music by: Philip Glass
- Production company: Opticnerve
- Distributed by: Oscilloscope
- Release date: 2023
- Running time: 52 minutes
- Country: United States
- Box office: $50,377

Once Within a Time is a 2023 American experimental fantasy comedy film written, produced, and directed by Godfrey Reggio and edited and co-directed by Jon Kane.

== Reception ==
On the review aggregator website Rotten Tomatoes, 94% of 18 critics' reviews are positive, with an average rating of 7.6/10.

Sheila O'Malley of RogerEbert.com gave the film three out of four stars and wrote, "Clocking in at 51 minutes, the film is all mood, all rhythm, with a kaleidoscope structure and undulating ever-shifting visuals in a constant state of flux. It's not a 'story' so much as a tone-poem collage about technology, knowledge, innocence/experience, and the potential end of the world. Maybe something new will be born from the ashes, although considering the evidence that something may very well be a monster."
