= Naqoyqatsi =

2002 film by Godfrey Reggio

- Film poster
- Directed by: Godfrey Reggio
- Written by: Godfrey Reggio
- Produced by: Steven Soderbergh; Joe Beirne; Godfrey Reggio; Lawrence Taub
- Cinematography: Russell Lee Fine
- Edited by: Jon Kane
- Music by: Philip Glass
- Production company: Qatsi Productions
- Distributed by: Miramax Films
- Release date: October 18, 2002
- Running time: 89 minutes
- Country: United States
- Budget: $3 million

Naqoyqatsi (Note: American English: /nɑːˈkɔɪˌkɑːtsi/ nah-KOY-kaht-SEE; Hopi: Naqö̀yqatsi [naˈqœjˌqat͡si]) is a 2002 American non-narrative film directed by Godfrey Reggio and edited by Jon Kane, with music composed by Philip Glass. It is the third and final installment in the Qatsi trilogy.

The title comes from the Hopi word naqö̀yqatsi meaning "life of war". In the film's closing credits, the title is also translated as "civilized violence" and "a life of killing each other".

== Synopsis ==
According to Reggio, the film has no screenplay per se, but three movements (like those of a symphony) with different themes:

1. Numerica.com: Language and place gives way to numerical code and virtual reality.
2. Circus maximus: Competition, winning, records, fame, “fair play” and the love of money are elevated to the prime values of life. Life becomes a game.
3. Rocketship twentieth century: A world that language can no longer describe. The resulting explosive tempo of technology is war and civilized violence.

== Production ==
The September 11 attacks against the World Trade Center took place very close to the film's production studio, impacting the content of the film and further convincing the crew of the importance of its subject.

While Koyaanisqatsi and Powaqqatsi examine modern life in industrial countries and the conflict between encroaching industrialization and traditional ways of life, using slow motion and time-lapse footage of cities and natural landscapes, about eighty percent of Naqoyqatsi uses archive footage and stock images manipulated and processed digitally on non-linear editing (non-sequential) workstations and intercut with specially-produced computer-generated imagery to demonstrate society's transition from a natural environment to a technology-based one. Reggio described the process as "virtual cinema".

== Music ==
Naqoyqatsi

Soundtrack album by Philip Glass
- Released: October 8, 2002
- Label: Sony Masterworks

The music is more in the traditional orchestral tradition than much of Glass's work as a familiar doorway to images so disconnected from the familiar world. One instrument, the cello played by Yo-Yo Ma, plays through much of the piece. Some non-orchestral instruments are used in addition to traditional ones, including a didgeridoo and an electronically-created jaw harp.

Soundtrack.net reviewer Glenn McClanan noted that unlike the previous two films, the music is more on the softer side.

Naqoyqatsi: Original Motion Picture Soundtrack (2002)
| No. | Title | Length |
|---|---|---|
| 1. | "Naqoyqatsi" | 7:56 |
| 2. | "Primacy of the Number" | 6:52 |
| 3. | "Massman" | 9:48 |
| 4. | "New World" | 3:04 |
| 5. | "Religion" | 9:01 |
| 6. | "Media Weather" | 7:54 |
| 7. | "Old World" | 3:08 |
| 8. | "Intensive Time" | 8:09 |
| 9. | "Point Blank" | 11:17 |
| 10. | "The Vivid Unknown" | 7:08 |
| 11. | "Definition" | 2:50 |
| Total length: | | 79:17 |

== Release and reception ==
The film was released on DVD by Miramax on October 14, 2003.

The Criterion Collection released this as part of the Qatsi trilogy on December 11, 2012.

Rotten Tomatoes reported that 48% out of 52 reviews were positive with the average score of 6.40/10, and the consensus saying that it is "the weakest film in Reggio's trilogy".

== See also ==
- Koyaanisqatsi (1982)
- Chronos (1985)
- Powaqqatsi (1988)
- Baraka (1992)
- Samsara (2011)
