= Powaqqatsi =

1988 film by Godfrey Reggio

- Theatrical release poster
- Directed by: Godfrey Reggio
- Written by: Godfrey Reggio; Ken Richards
- Produced by: Mel Lawrence; Godfrey Reggio; Lawrence Taub
- Cinematography: Graham Berry; Leonidas Zourdoumis
- Edited by: Iris Cahn; Alton Walpole
- Music by: Philip Glass
- Production companies: Institute for Regional Education; Golan-Globus
- Distributed by: The Cannon Group
- Release date: April 29, 1988
- Running time: 99 minutes
- Country: United States
- Budget: $4.2 million
- Box office: $589,244

Powaqqatsi (Note: American English: /poʊˈwɑːkˌkɑːtsi/ poh-WAHK-kaht-SEE; Hopi: [poˈwaqˌqat͡si]) is a 1988 American non-narrative film directed by Godfrey Reggio and presented by Francis Ford Coppola and George Lucas. It is the sequel to Reggio's experimental 1982 film Koyaanisqatsi, and the second film in Qatsi trilogy, which was followed by Naqoyqatsi (2002).

The film's title is a Hopi neologism coined by Reggio meaning "parasitic way of life" or "life in transition". While Koyaanisqatsi focused on modern life in industrial countries, Powaqqatsi, which similarly has no dialogue, focuses more on the conflict in Third World countries between traditional ways of life and the new ways of life introduced with industrialization. As with Koyaanisqatsi and the third and final part of the Qatsi trilogy, Naqoyqatsi, the film is strongly related to its soundtrack, written by Philip Glass.

== Synopsis ==
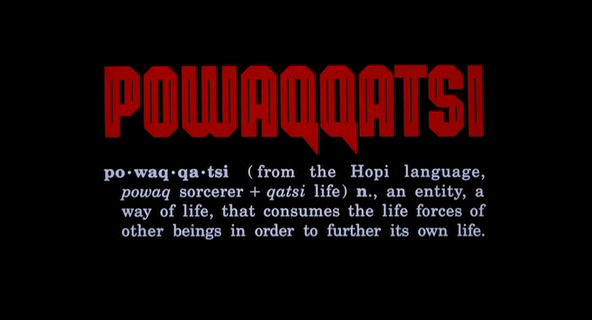
Screenshot from the end of the film

In the beginning chapter, Serra Pelada, men from Serra Pelada (a gold mine in Brazil) are seen carrying bags of dirt up to a destination. In the middle of the chapter, various shots outside of Serra Pelada are shown. Near the end of the chapter, a few men are carrying another man who was struck by a falling rock (mentioned in the "Impact of Progress" feature on the DVD/Blu-ray) uphill along a procession of workers who are carrying dirt-filled sacks. After that, several discordant layered exposures of the dirt carriers are shown. The scene cross fades to show the image of a head, with multiple exposures of the same head rapidly rotating and layered upon to give a manifold appearance. This is an apparent allusion to Janus, the god of beginnings, endings and transitions, keeping with the film's central themes of progress and change.

In Anthem: Part 1, the sun rises up above an African village. Later, a man raises a sail for a boat. The next chapter, That Place, starts zooming out from a waterfall. Children can be heard laughing. Villages are shown as well as children and upside down water reflections. Anthem: Part 2 has various shots of villages and islands shown.

Mosque and Temple shows various natural shots as well as religious scenes. Some of these scenes are a transparent inside a church with someone walking by, a man praying, a monk sitting while a bird flies off his stick, the same monk walking by the river, a bird flying by a sunset, more children, crows flying above a river, two men rowing their boat in that river, a woman praying in the Ganges river, two men practicing yoga, another monk, and a temple in Nepal.

Anthem: Part 3 shows masses of people in motion, working together and celebrating traditional rituals, in Africa and South America, all in slow-motion.

Video Dream blends together colorful television advertisements and news programs from the US, Western Europe, the Soviet Union and Japan.

New Cities In Ancient Lands has views of people on the move, and traffic in three parts: China, Africa and India.

The Unutterable/Caught! features people in large groups in the developing world, moving together, at work; along with views of traffic from above.

Mr. Suso / From Egypt Sometimes-unfocused people in motion, to the muezzin's call, ghostly double-images of traffic, close-ups of faces, reflections in water.

== Music ==
A soundtrack was produced in 1988, composed by Philip Glass, with the opening track "Serra Pelada" co-written with Argentine musician Bernardo Palombo.

Powaqqatsi: Original Motion Picture Soundtrack (1988)
No.	Title	Length
1.	"Serra Pelada" (co-written with Bernardo Palombo)	5:00
2.	"The Title"	0:25
3.	"Anthem: Part 1"	6:22
4.	"That Place"	4:41
5.	"Anthem: Part 2"	3:49
6.	"Mosque and Temple"	4:42
7.	"Anthem: Part 3"	8:11
8.	"Train to São Paulo"	3:04
9.	"Video Dream"	2:14
10.	"New Cities In Ancient Lands: China"	2:47
11.	"New Cities In Ancient Lands: Africa"	2:56
12.	"New Cities In Ancient Lands: India"	4:42
13.	"The Unutterable"	7:02
14.	"Caught!"	7:20
15.	"Mr. Suso #1"	1:08
16.	"From Egypt"	2:23
17.	"Mr. Suso #2 with Reflection"	1:18
18.	"Powaqqatsi"	4:35
Total length:		73:38

== Reception ==
Rotten Tomatoes reported that 56% out of 9 reviews were positive with the average score of 7.0/10 and said it "wasn't as eagerly embraced by viewers and critics as its popular predecessor."

The New York Times said "There are two kinds of dirt to be found in Powaqqatsi: good dirt and bad. ... [the director] magnifies this distinction until it achieves mountainous proportions, yet still he manages to see it in starkly one-dimensional terms." Roger Ebert said "There are images of astonishing beauty in Godfrey Reggio's "Powaqqatsi," sequences when we marvel at the sights of the Earth, and yet when the film is over there is the feeling that we are still waiting for it to begin. ... Reggio seemed to think that man himself is some kind of virus infecting the planet - that we would enjoy Earth more, in other words, if we weren't here." On Siskel and Ebert at the Movies with he and Gene Siskel each agreed to give the film a thumbs down, he also called it a "New Age music video".

Time Out said that it is "visually stunning, but undermined by a fairly serious flaw. ... At best the message is a fairly obvious criticism of First World domination of the Third, and at worst a hippy celebration of the Dignity of Labour." Greg Klymkiw said "... the trilogy, [of which Powaqqatsi is the second part] while a stoner experience of the first order, can be equally appreciated by those who remain straight. Much of it is mind-blowingly mind-fucking without mind-altering substances."

== Influence and legacy ==
- The music from Anthem: Part 2 was used in and is now best associated with the 1998 film The Truman Show. it was also used in several film trailers, including that of Dead Man Walking.
- The Criterion Collection released it as part of the Qatsi trilogy set.
- Footage from the film — the same that was used for its poster — was used in the 1990 television special The Earth Day Special during a sequence in which Dr. Emmett Brown from the Back to the Future shows Doogie Howser, M.D. what the Earth's future looks like unless something is done about pollution.

== See also ==
- Koyaanisqatsi (1982)
- Chronos (1985)
- Naqoyqatsi (2002)
- Baraka (1992)
- Samsara (2011)
