= Lawrence Taub =

Lawrence Taub (1936–2018) was a futurist and the author of the book The Spiritual Imperative: Sex, Age, and The Last Caste (Clear Glass Press, 2002, ISBN 0-931425-37-9).

== Career ==
Taub was born and grew up in Newark, New Jersey’s Central Ward ghetto in 1936, of Jewish ancestry. He received his B.A. in history from New York University (summa cum laude, Phi Beta Kappa), with minors in Political Science and French. Next he studied at Harvard Law School. Later, Taub chose not to return to Harvard University School of Law from a two-year leave of absence. Instead, he went to the Sorbonne (University of Paris) to earn a certificate to teach French.

Taub lived and worked in Los Angeles, Paris, Copenhagen, Stockholm, Israel, India, Kathmandu, New York City, Munich, and Australia. He eventually settled in Tokyo, where he has lived for 23 of the last 31 years. There he worked as an ESL instructor, free-lance translator from Swedish, Hebrew, German, and Japanese to English, and as a narrator of commercial films. He spoke ten languages with different levels of fluency.

Taub had attracted attention in Japan since the 1970s, giving lectures and predicting global developments.

== The Spiritual Imperative: Sex, Age, and The Last Caste ==
The title of the book refers to three models the author developed to give readers a framework for anticipating global future trends. The book has been translated into Japanese, Korean and Spanish. In 2013, the Japanese edition of the book reached the Number 1 spot on the Japanese bestsellers list. In the foreword to the Japanese edition, economist Masanori Kanda referred to Taub as Alvin Toffler, Peter Drucker and John Kenneth Galbraith all rolled into one.

== Multinational Sex ==
In the early 1970s, he collaborated with Sawako Takagi, a co-founder of the Japanese radical feminist movement, on Femintern Press, a feminist publishing project. He later co-authored Multinational Sex, one of the first books exposing the ins and outs of sex tourism.

Taub's book presents his macrohistorical discoveries and predicts future trends based on them. He published articles on the subject, presented related papers at conferences and was interviewed on radio and television. He was a member of the World Futures Studies Federation since 1997.
