= Curionópolis =

- Municipality
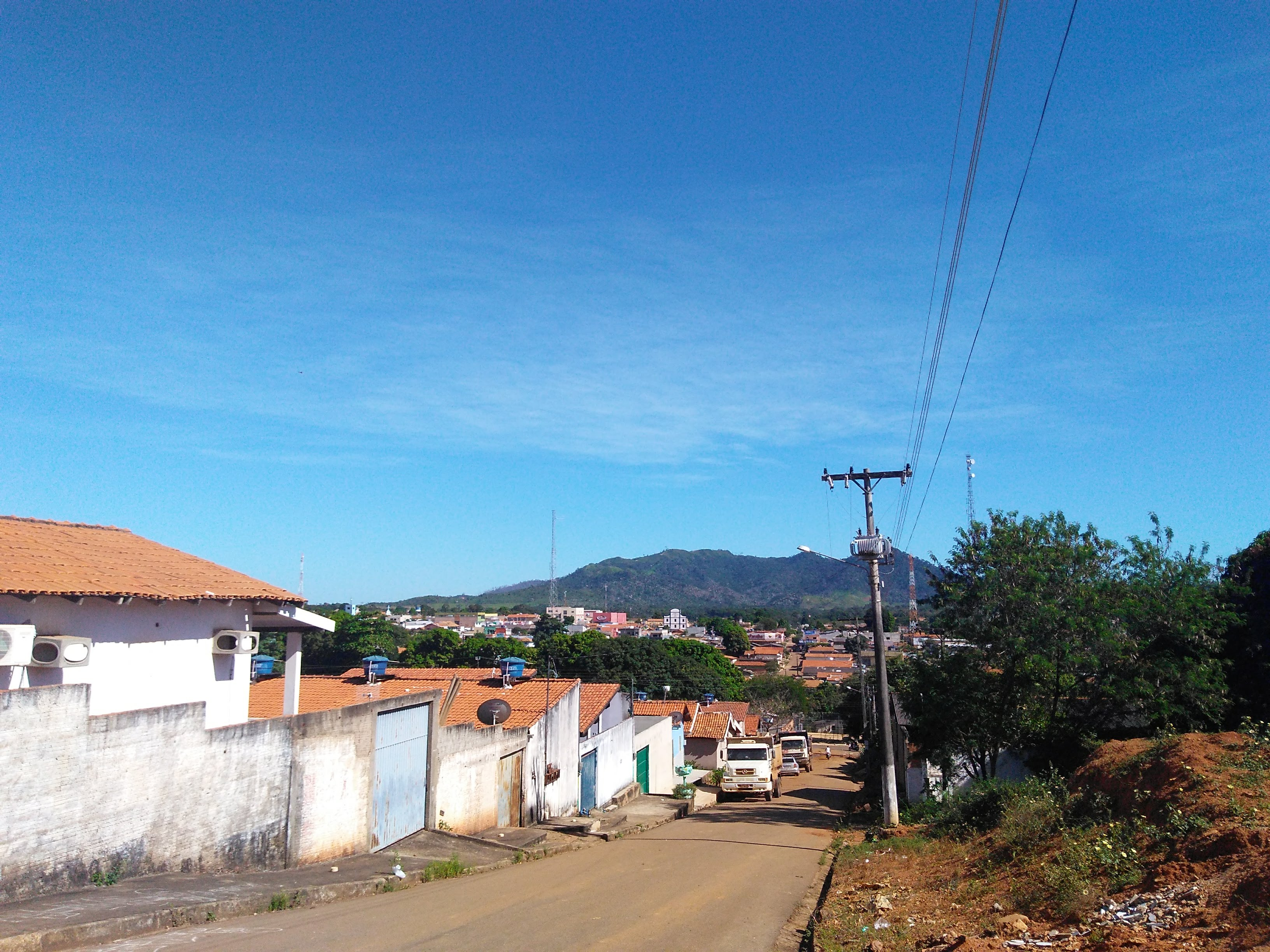

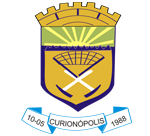
- Flag Coat of arms

- Location of Curionópolis in the State of Pará

- Location in Brazil
- Coordinates: 6°05′27″S 49°32′27″W
- Country: Brazil
- Region: Northern
- State: Pará
- Mesoregion: Sudeste Paraense

Population (2020)
  - Total: 17,846
- Time zone: UTC−3 (BRT)
- Website: Official website

Curionópolis is a municipality in the state of Pará in the Northern region of Brazil. The area, originally rainforest, was first settled in 1977, and the municipality was established as a result of the Serra Pelada gold rush in 1979 and named Trinta. In 1981, it was renamed Curionópolis in honor of Sebastião Curió, an officer in charge of the Serra Pelada mine and its environs.

== Climate ==
Curionópolis has tropical monsoon climate (Köppen climate classification: Am), on summer the temperature rises to 34°C.

== See also ==
- List of municipalities in Pará
