= Qatsi trilogy =

1982–2002 series of films by Godfrey Reggio

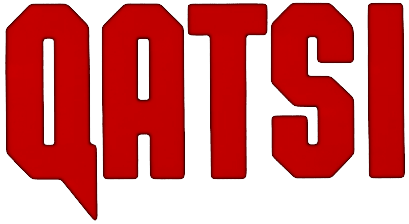
- Qatsi trilogy wordmark
- Created by: Godfrey Reggio
- Original work: Koyaanisqatsi (1982)
- Owners: Metro-Goldwyn-Mayer (1-2); Miramax (3)
- Years: 1982–2002

Films and television
- Film(s): Koyaanisqatsi (1982); Powaqqatsi (1988); Naqoyqatsi (2002)

Audio
- Soundtrack(s): Koyaanisqatsi (1982); Powaqqatsi (1988); Naqoyqatsi (2002)

The Qatsi trilogy (Note: American English: /ˈkɑːtsi/ KAHT-see; Hopi: [ˈqat͡si]) is a series of three non-narrative films produced by Godfrey Reggio and scored by Philip Glass. The trilogy includes Koyaanisqatsi (1982), Powaqqatsi (1988), and Naqoyqatsi (2002).

The titles of the films are derived from the Hopi language, in which the word qatsi translates to "life". The series was produced by the Institute For Regional Education, who also created the Fund For Change.

== Legacy ==
Many of director Godfrey Reggio's other motion-pictures use cinematic techniques and stylistic elements he first explored in the Qatsi trilogy.

The cinematic films of Koyaanisqatsi cinematographer Ron Fricke—Chronos (1985), Baraka (1992), and Samsara (2011)—are also made in a similar style.

== Films ==
Film	U.S. theatrical release date	Director	Music	Cinematography	Editor	Producer	Writer
Koyaanisqatsi	April 27, 1983	Godfrey Reggio	Philip Glass	Ron Fricke	Alton Walpole; Ron Fricke	Godfrey Reggio	Concept: Godfrey Reggio; Scenario: Ron Fricke; Michael Hoenig; Godfrey Reggio; Alton Walpole
Powaqqatsi	April 29, 1988	Godfrey Reggio	Philip Glass	Graham Berry; Leonidas Zourdoumis	Iris Cahn; Alton Walpole	Mel Lawrence; Godfrey Reggio; Lawrence Taub	Godfrey Reggio; Ken Richards
Naqoyqatsi	October 18, 2002	Godfrey Reggio	Philip Glass	Russell Lee Fine	Jon Kane	Joe Beirne; Godfrey Reggio; Lawrence Taub	Godfrey Reggio
