= Godfrey Reggio =

American filmmaker (born 1940)

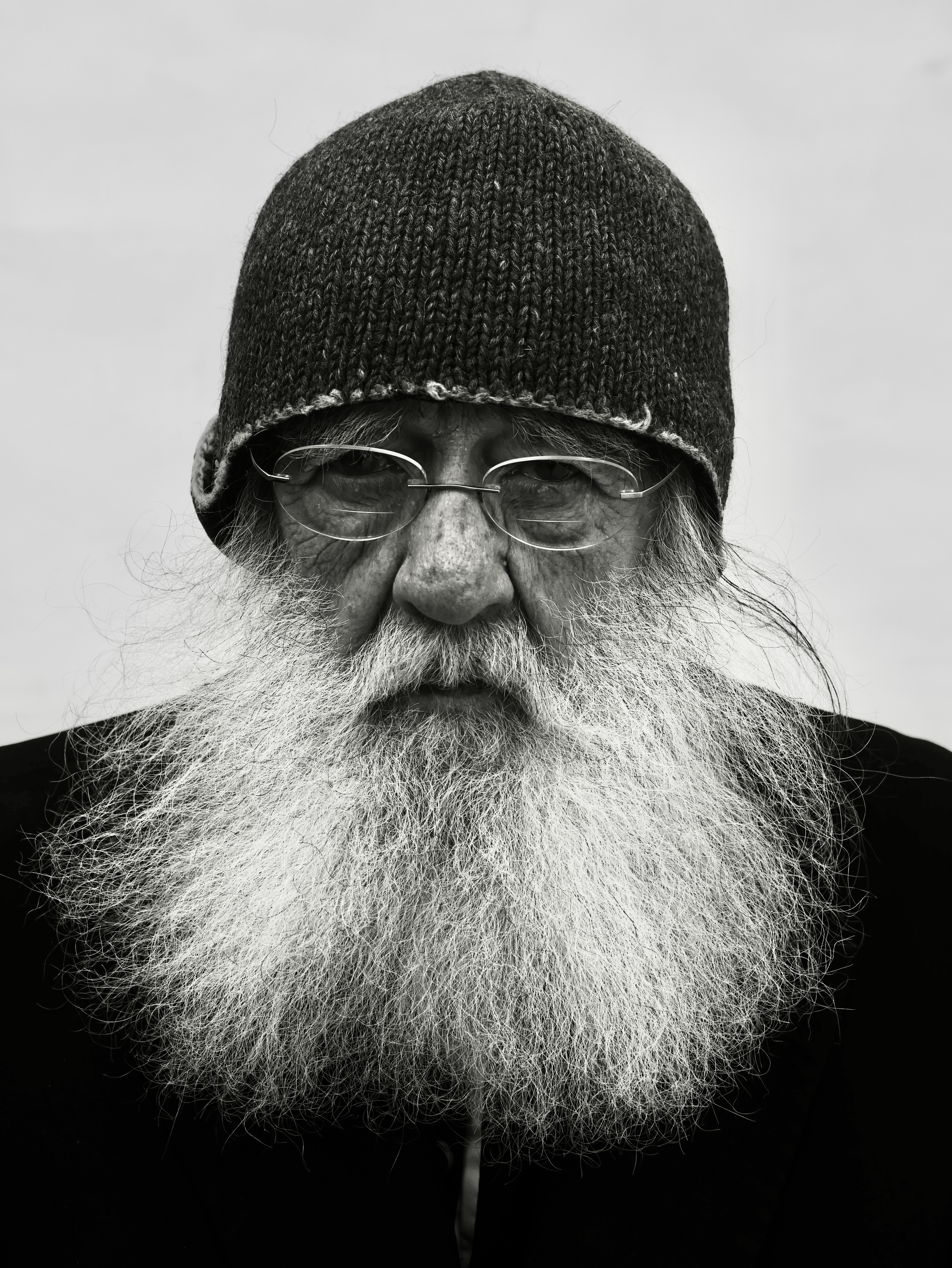
- Reggio in 2022
- Born: 1940 (age 85–86); New Orleans, Louisiana, U.S.
- Occupation: Filmmaker
- Known for: Qatsi trilogy
- Spouse: Marti Reggio
- Website: https://www.godfreyreggiofoundation.org

Godfrey Reggio (born 1940) is an American director of experimental documentary films.

== Life ==
Reggio was born in New Orleans in 1940 to a Catholic family. He left home at age 14 to join the Catholic Christian Brotherhood. He became a monk, and spent 14 years in silence and prayer during his training.

During the 1950s and 60s, Reggio worked as a social activist with Chicano street gangs with the Brotherhood in New Mexico. One of the brothers introduced him to the film Los Olvidados by the Spanish-French-Mexican surrealist filmmaker Luis Buñuel which influenced him greatly. He also acknowledges Artavazd Peleshyan, a documentary-poet, who was a mentor and friend.

== Early work ==
Reggio helped found the Institute for Regional Education in Santa Fe, New Mexico, a non-profit foundation. He became a founder of La Clinica de la Gente, a facility providing medical care and service to 12,000 community members in northern New Mexico's barrios, as well as founding the Young Citizens for Action, a project aiding juveniles in the street gangs of Santa Fe.

Reggio worked with the American Civil Liberties Union of New Mexico in 1972, to develop a media campaign dealing with the loss of privacy and the rise of surveillance, as well as the militarization of police in the U.S. during the post-Vietnam War era. The media campaign was presented on television, radio, billboards and in major newspapers.

== Filmmaker ==
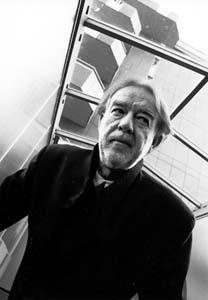
Reggio in 1995

Reggio is widely known for his wordless filmography, especially the Qatsi trilogy of Koyaanisqatsi ("Life Out of Balance", 1982), Powaqqatsi ("Life in Transformation", 1988), and Naqoyqatsi ("Life as War", 2002). The film titles are taken from the Hopi language. His short film Evidence explores the effect of cinema on the minds of children, and his documentary Anima Mundi is a montage of images of over seventy animal species. His film Visitors, which premiered at the Toronto International Film Festival, consists for the most part of extended slow-motion closeups of people's faces, looking directly into the camera.

In 2022 Reggio released his film Once Within a Time. It was produced by Steven Soderbergh and Alexander Rodnyansky and had its world premiere at Santa Fe International Film Festival (SFiFF) in October 2022. The festival awarded him the Lifetime Achievement Award.

Reggio has collaborated with the composer Philip Glass many times on the musical and orchestral soundtracks that augment Reggio's wordless films. He also collaborates with Jon Kane, a fellow filmmaker.

In 2014, Reggio was recognized by the Museum of Arts and Design in New York City with a full career retrospective titled Life with Technology: The Cinema of Godfrey Reggio.

The bulk of Reggio's cinematic records, manuscripts, papers, photographs, film rolls, over forty years, have been acquired by Harvard University's Houghton Library, and the Harvard Film Archive.

His work continues with the Godfrey Reggio Foundation, which his wife Marti started in 2024.

=== Influences ===
In an interview with Revus et Corriges, Reggio stated that he was particularly influenced by the work of experimental filmmakers such as Stan Brakhage and Maya Deren. Like these filmmakers, Reggio uses film as a medium for exploring the boundaries of perception and consciousness, using the camera as a tool for capturing the unseen and the intangible.

== Personal life ==
Since the 1960s, Reggio has lived in Santa Fe, New Mexico.

== Filmography ==
Year	Name	Director	Writer	Producer	Notes
1982	Koyaanisqatsi	Yes	Yes	Yes	First film in the Qatsi trilogy
1988	Powaqqatsi	Yes	Yes	Yes	Second film in the Qatsi trilogy
1989	"Patricia's Park"	Yes			Music video for Alphaville; released on Songlines compilation
1991	Anima Mundi	Yes	Yes		Short film
1992	Fated to Be Queer			Yes	Short film
1995	Evidence	Yes			Short film
1995	The Many Adventures of Diecast	Yes			Short film
2002	Naqoyaqatsi	Yes	Yes	Yes	Third film in the Qatsi trilogy
2013	Visitors	Yes	Yes	Yes	
2018	Awaken			Executive	
2023	Once Within a Time	Yes	Yes	Yes	Short film
2024	Underground Orange			Executive	Feature film

== See also ==
- The City (1939)
